= Index of ancient Rome–related articles =

Roman civilisation from the 8th century BC to the 5th century AD

This page lists topics related to ancient Rome.

== 0–9 ==
- 14 regions of Augustan Rome

== A ==
- A cognitionibus
- A rationibus
- Ab Asturica Burdigalam
- Ab epistulis
- Ab urbe condita
- Abalienatio
- Abatis
- Abolla
- Abrogatio
- Abulci
- Abusina
- Acca Larentia
- Accensi
- Acceptilatio
- Accessio (Roman law)
- Acclamatio
- Accubitum
- Acerra (incense box)
- Acestes
- Acetabulum (unit)
- Achaia (Roman province)
- Achlis
- Acta Arvalia
- Acta Caesaris
- Acta Diurna
- Acta Senatus
- Actia
- Actio Pauliana
- Actio popularis
- Acueducto de los Milagros
- Acumincum
- Ad Mutriam (castra)
- Ad Pannonios (castra)
- Ad Turres (Bruttium)
- Adlocutio
- Admissionales
- Adoption in ancient Rome
- Adrogation
- Adsidui
- Adventus (ceremony)
- Aedes Tensarum
- Aedicula
- Aedile
- Aelia Capitolina
- Aemilianus
- Aeminium
- Aeneator
- Aequitas
- Aequum
- Aerarii
- Aerarium
- Aerarium militare
- Aes equestre
- Aes grave
- Aes hordearium
- Aes rude
- Aes signatum
- Aes uxorium
- Aesepus Bridge
- Aesica
- Aeternitas
- Afri
- Africa (Roman province)
- African red slip ware
- Agentes in rebus
- Agger (ancient Rome)
- Ager publicus
- Ager Romanus
- Agnomen
- Agonalia
- Agora of Smyrna
- Agrarian law
- Agri Decumates
- Agriculture in ancient Rome
- Ain Diwar Bridge
- Aïn Doura Baths
- Aius Locutius
- Aizis (castra)
- Ala (Roman allied military unit)
- Ala Afrorum
- Ala Gallorum Indiana
- Ala Gallorum Petriana
- Alares
- Alb Limes
- Alba Fucens
- Alba Longa
- Alban wine
- Albani lion
- Albaniana (Roman fort)
- Albarregas Roman bridge
- Album (Ancient Rome)
- Alcántara Bridge
- Alcantarilla Dam
- Alchester (Roman town)
- Alconétar Bridge
- Aldobrandini Wedding
- Alea iacta est
- Alexamenos graffito
- Alexander Mosaic
- Alexandrian riots (38 CE)
- Algidum
- Alimenta
- Alkedo (ship)
- Alluvion (Roman law)
- Almonacid de la Cuba Dam
- Alpes Graiae et Poeninae
- Alpes Cottiae
- Alpes Maritimae
- Alpine regiments of the Roman army
- Alpinorum auxiliary regiments
- Alta Semita
- Altar of Domitius Ahenobarbus
- Altar of Saturn
- Altar of Victory
- Altar of the Gens Augusta
- Altenum (castra)
- Alyscamps
- Ambarvalia
- Ambiorix's revolt
- Ambitus
- Amburbium
- Amicitia
- Amicus curiae
- Amiternum
- Amor fati
- Amphitheater of Caligula
- Amphitheatre of Capua
- Amphitheatre of Catania
- Amphitheatre of Durrës
- Amphitheatre of El Jem
- Amphitheatre of Libarna
- Amphitheater of Lixus
- Amphitheatre of Mérida
- Amphitheater of Nero
- Amphitheatre of Pompeii
- Amphitheatre of Serdica
- Amphitheater of Statilius Taurus
- Amphitheatre of the Three Gauls
- Amphitheatrum Castrense
- Amphora (unit)
- Ampulla
- Amulius
- Ancaster (Roman town)
- Ancient road in Tarsus
- Ancient Rome
- Ancient Rome and wine
- Ancient Roman architecture
- Ancient Roman bathing
- Ancient Roman cuisine
- Ancient Roman defensive walls
- Ancient Roman engineering
- Ancient Roman military clothing
- Ancient Roman philosophy
- Ancient Roman pottery
- Ancient Roman sarcophagi
- Ancient Roman technology
- Ancient Roman units of measurement
- Ancient Theatre of Fourvière
- Ancile
- Ancillae
- Andautonia
- Angaria (Roman law)
- Angrivarian Wall
- Angustia (castra)
- Angusticlavia
- Anicetus (freedman)
- Anicetus (pirate)
- Animus (law)
- Annales maximi
- Annona (mythology)
- Antefix
- Antemnae
- Anthemius
- Antinous Farnese
- Antinous Mondragone
- Antioch mosaics
- Antium
- Antonine Itinerary
- Antonine Plague
- Antoninianus
- Antoninus Pius
- Antony's Atropatene campaign
- Antony's campaign against Armenia
- Anxurus
- Apex (headdress)
- Apocolocyntosis
- Apodyterium
- Apollo Barberini
- Apollo Citharoedus
- Apollo Citharoedus (Vatican)
- Apparitor
- Appius Claudius Sabinus Regillensis
- Aprilis
- Apulon
- Apulum (castra)
- Aqua Alexandrina
- Aqua Alsietina
- Aqua Anio Novus
- Aqua Anio Vetus
- Aqua Appia
- Aqua Augusta (Naples)
- Aqua Augusta (Rome)
- Aqua Crabra
- Aqua Claudia
- Aqua Julia
- Aqua Marcia
- Aqua Tepula
- Aqua Traiana
- Aqua Virgo
- Aquaviva, Pannonia
- Aquae Arnemetiae
- Aquae Flaviae
- Aquae Helveticae
- Aquae Iasae
- Aquae Sulis
- Aqueduct of Diocletian
- Aqueduct of Kavala
- Aqueduct of Luynes
- Aqueduct of Segovia
- Aqueduct of Valens
- Aqueduct of the Gier
- Aquila (Roman)
- Aquilifer
- Aquincum
- Aquincum Mithraeum (of Victorinus)
- Ara Pacis
- Ara trium Galliarum
- Ara Ubiorum
- Arabia Petraea
- Arapsu Bridge
- Arbelas
- Arcadia Aegypti
- Arcadius
- Arc de Berà
- Arch of Galerius and Rotunda
- Arch of Alexander Severus
- Arch of Arcadius, Honorius and Theodosius
- Arch of Augustus (Aosta)
- Arch of Augustus (Fano)
- Arch of Augustus (Rimini)
- Arch of Augustus, Rome
- Arch of Augustus (Susa)
- Arch of Cabanes
- Arch of Campanus
- Arch of Caracalla (Djémila)
- Arch of Caracalla (Thebeste)
- Arch of Carpentras
- Arch of Claudius (British victory)
- Arch of Constantine
- Arch of Dolabella
- Arch of Drusus
- Arch of Galerius and Rotunda
- Arch of Gallienus
- Arch of Germanicus
- Arch of Germanicus (Rome)
- Arch of Gratian, Valentinian and Theodosius
- Arch of Hadrian (Athens)
- Arch of Hadrian (Capua)
- Arch of Hadrian (Jerash)
- Arch of Janus
- Arch of Lentulus and Crispinus
- Arch of Malborghetto
- Arch of Marcus Aurelius
- Arch of Marcus Aurelius (Rome)
- Arch of Nero
- Arch of Octavius
- Arch of Pietas
- Arch of Portugal
- Arch of Septimius Severus
- Arch of Septimius Severus (Leptis Magna)
- Arch of Tiberius
- Arch of Titus
- Arch of Titus (Circus Maximus)
- Arch of Trajan (Ancona)
- Arch of Trajan (Benevento)
- Arch of Trajan (Canosa)
- Arch of Trajan (Timgad)
- Arch of the Sergii
- Archaeological site of Sbeitla
- Arches of Claudius
- Archaic Triad
- Archiater
- Archimime
- Arco dei Gavi, Verona
- Arcus Argentariorum
- Arcus Novus
- Arena of Nîmes
- Arènes de Fréjus
- Arènes de Lutèce
- Argei
- Argenteus
- Argentoratum
- Argentovaria
- Argiletum
- Arles Amphitheatre
- Arles bust
- Arles Rhône 3
- Armilla (military decoration)
- Armilustrium
- Arminius
- Armorica
- Arval Brethren
- Arx (Roman)
- As (Roman coin)
- Asia (Roman province)
- Aspendos
- Assassination of Julius Caesar
- Associations in ancient Rome
- Assyria (Roman province)
- Atellan Farce
- Athenaeum (ancient Rome)
- Atrium Libertatis
- Auctorati
- Auctoritas
- Audax, Ditalcus and Minurus
- Augsburg Victory Altar
- Augur
- Auguraculum
- Augusta Emerita
- Augusta Munatiana
- Augusta Raurica
- Augustalia
- Augustamnica
- Augustan and Julio-Claudian art
- Augustan literature (ancient Rome)
- Augustan poetry
- Augusteum
- Augustus
- Augustus (title)
- Aulus (praenomen)
- Aurelian
- Aurelian Walls
- Aureus
- Auxilia
- Auxilia palatina
- Ave Imperator, morituri te salutant
- Aventicum
- Aventine Hill
- Aventine Triad
- Avernus
- Avitus

== B ==
- Babuino
- Bacchanalia
- Bacchus
- Baelo Claudia
- Bagaudae
- Bagnaccio
- Baiae
- Balatro
- Ballıgerme
- Ballista
- Ballistarius
- Balloon (game)
- Ballot laws of the Roman Republic
- Balsa (Roman town)
- Band-e Kaisar
- Bannaventa
- Baptisterium
- Barbara Baths
- Barbaricum
- Barbarous radiate
- Barbegal aqueduct and mills
- Barber Cup and Crawford Cup
- Barracks emperor
- Basilica
- Basilica Aemilia
- Basilica Argentaria
- Basilica Fulvia
- Basilica Hilariana
- Basilica Julia
- Basilica of Junius Bassus
- Basilica of Maxentius
- Basilica of Neptune
- Basilica Opimia
- Basilica Porcia
- Basilica Sempronia
- Basilica Ulpia
- Basiliscus
- Basterna
- Batavi (military unit)
- Baths at Ostia
- Bath curse tablets
- Baths of Agrippa
- Baths of Antoninus
- Baths of Arcadius
- Baths of Caracalla
- Baths of Commodus
- Baths of Constantine (Rome)
- Baths of Decius
- Baths of Diocletian
- Baths of Licinius Sura
- Baths of Nero
- Baths of Nero (Pisa)
- Baths of Titus
- Baths of Trajan
- Baths of Zeuxippus
- Batillum
- Battering ram
- Battle at the Harzhorn
- Battle of Abritus
- Battle of Acerrae
- Battle of Actium
- Battle of Adamclisi
- Battle of Adrianople (324)
- Battle of Adrianople
- Battle of Adys
- Battle of Aesernia
- Battle of Ager Falernus
- Battle of Agrigentum
- Battle of Agrigentum (456)
- Battle of Alesia
- Battle of Amanus Pass
- Battle of Antioch (218)
- Battle of Aquae Sextiae
- Battle of Aquilonia
- Battle of Arausio
- Battle of Arbalo
- Battle of Arelate
- Battle of Argentovaria
- Battle of Arles (435)
- Battle of Arles (471)
- Battle of Arretium
- Battle of Artaxata
- Battle of Ascurum
- Battle of Asculum (89 BC)
- Battle of Aufidius River
- Battle of the Abas
- Battle of the Aegates
- Battle of the Allia
- Battle of the Angrivarian Wall
- Battle of the Anio River (361 BC)
- Battle of the Arar
- Battle of the Asio River (82 BC)
- Battle of the Axona
- Battle of Baduhenna Wood
- Battle of Baecula
- Battle of Bagavan
- Battle of Barbalissos
- Battle of Bedriacum
- Battle of Beneventum (212 BC)
- Battle of Beneventum (214 BC)
- Battle of Bergamo
- Battle of Beroe
- Battle of Beth Horon (66)
- Battle of Bibracte
- Battle of Bovianum
- Battle of Bovillae
- Battle of Brumath
- Battle of Burdigala
- Battle of the Baetis River
- Battle of the Bagradas (49 BC)
- Battle of the Bagradas River (255 BC)
- Battle of Cabira
- Battle of Camerinum
- Battle of Campi Cannini
- Battle of Camulodunum
- Battle of Cannae
- Battle of Cantenna
- Battle of Canusium
- Battle of Canusium (89 BC)
- Battle of Cape Ecnomus
- Battle of Capua
- Battle of Carmona
- Battle of Carnuntum
- Battle of Carrhae
- Battle of Carrhae (296)
- Battle of Carteia
- Battle of Carteia (naval)
- Battle of Carthage (238)
- Battle of Cartagena (209 BC)
- Battle of Cartagena (461)
- Battle of Chaeronea (86 BC)
- Battle of Chalcedon (74 BC)
- Battle of Châlons (274)
- Battle of Chrysopolis
- Battle of Cibalae
- Battle of Cirta
- Battle of Cissa
- Battle of Clastidium
- Battle of Constantinople (378)
- Battle of Corbio
- Battle of Corsica
- Battle of Corycus
- Battle of Cremona (200 BC)
- Battle of Crotona
- Battle of Ctesiphon (165)
- Battle of Ctesiphon (198)
- Battle of Ctesiphon (263)
- Battle of Ctesiphon (363)
- Battle of Cyzicus (193)
- Battle of the Catalaunian Plains
- Battle of the Caudine Forks
- Battle of the Cilician Gates
- Battle of the Colline Gate
- Battle of the Cremera
- Battle of Decimomannu
- Battle of Déols
- Battle of Dibaltum
- Battle of Drepana
- Battle of Durocortorum
- Battle of Dyrrhachium (48 BC)
- Battle of Ebro River
- Battle of Edessa
- Battle of Emesa
- Battle of Faesulae (225 BC)
- Battle of Faesulae (406)
- Battle of Fano
- Battle of Faventia (82 BC)
- Battle of Fidenae (437 BC)
- Battle of Fidentia (82 BC)
- Battle of Firmum
- Battle of Forum Gallorum
- Battle of Forum Julii
- Battle of Fucine Lake
- Battle of the Frigidus
- Battle of Garigliano (457)
- Battle of Gatae
- Battle of Gergovia
- Battle of Geronium
- Battle of Grumentum
- Battle of the Great Plains
- Battle of Halys
- Battle of Herdonia (210 BC)
- Battle of Herdonia (212 BC)
- Battle of Hippo Regius
- Battle of Histria
- Battle of the Hellespont
- Battle of Ibera
- Battle of Idistaviso
- Battle of Ilerda
- Battle of Ilipa
- Battle of Imbrinium
- Battle of Immae
- Battle of Insubria
- Battle of Interamna Nahars
- Battle of Issus (194)
- Battle of Italica
- Battle of the Isère River
- Battle of Korakesion
- Battle of Lake Benacus
- Battle of the Colline Gate
- Battle of Lake Constance
- Battle of Lake Regillus
- Battle of Lake Trasimene
- Battle of Lake Tunis
- Battle of Lake Vadimo (283 BC)
- Battle of Lake Vadimo (310 BC)
- Battle of Lauro
- Battle of Lauron
- Battle of Lautulae
- Battle of Lemnos (73 BCE)
- Battle of Lilybaeum
- Battle of Lingones
- Battle of the Lipari Islands
- Battle of Locus Castorum
- Battle of Lugdunum
- Battle of Lutetia
- Battle of the Lacus Curtius
- Battle of the Lupia River
- Battle of the Lycus
- Battle of Magetobriga
- Battle of Manlian Pass
- Battle of Maranga
- Battle of Marcianople
- Battle of Mardia
- Battle of Mediolanum
- Battle of Messana
- Battle of Misiche
- Battle of Mons Graupius
- Battle of Mons Seleucus
- Battle of Mount Algidus
- Battle of Mount Falernus
- Battle of Mount Gaurus
- Battle of Mount Gindarus
- Battle of Mount Olympus
- Battle of Mount Scorobas
- Battle of Mount Tifata
- Battle of Mount Vesuvius
- Battle of Munda
- Battle of Mursa Major
- Battle of Mylae
- Battle of Mylae (36 BC)
- Battle of the Margus
- Battle of the Medway
- Battle of the Metaurus
- Battle of the Milvian Bridge
- Battle of the Muthul
- Battle of Mutina (193 BC)
- Battle of Mutina
- Battle of Naissus
- Battle of Narbonne (436)
- Battle of Naulochus
- Battle of Nepheris (147 BC)
- Battle of Nicaea
- Battle of Nicopolis (48 BC)
- Battle of Nicopolis ad Istrum
- Battle of Nisibis (217)
- Battle of Nola (89 BC)
- Battle of Nola (214 BC)
- Battle of Nola (215 BC)
- Battle of Nola (216 BC)
- Battle of Noreia
- Battle of Noviodunum
- Battle of Numistro
- Battle of the Nervasos Mountains
- Battle near Osca
- Battle of Octodurus
- Battle of Orchomenus
- Battle of Orleans (463)
- Battle of Ostia (409)
- Battle at Pontes Longi
- Battle of Panormus
- Battle of Pavia (271)
- Battle of Pavia (476)
- Battle of Pedum (338 BC)
- Battle of Petelia
- Battle of Pharsalus
- Battle of Philippi
- Battle of Phintias
- Battle of Picenum
- Battle of Pistoia
- Battle of Placentia (271)
- Battle of Pollentia
- Battle of Pometia
- Battle of Populonia
- Battle of Protopachium
- Battle of the Pelorus
- Battle of the Port of Carthage
- Battle of Ravenna (475)
- Battle of Ravenna (476)
- Battle of Resaena
- Battle of Rhone Crossing
- Battle of Rimini (432)
- Battle of Ruspina
- Battle of the Rhyndacus (73 BC)
- Battle of Sacriporto
- Battle of Saguntum (75 BC)
- Battle of Samarra (363)
- Battle of Sarmizegetusa
- Battle of Satala (298)
- Battle of Saticula
- Battle of Save
- Battle of Sena Gallica (82 BC)
- Battle of Sentinum
- Battle of Silva Arsia
- Battle of Silva Litana
- Battle of Singara (344)
- Battle of Soissons (486)
- Battle of Solicinium
- Battle of Stanwick
- Battle of Strasbourg
- Battle of Sucro
- Battle of Suessula
- Battle of Sulci
- Battle of Suthul
- Battle of the Sabis
- Battle of the Silarius River
- Battle of the Silarus
- Battle of Taenum
- Battle of Tarentum (209 BC)
- Battle of Tarentum (212 BC)
- Battle of Tarraco
- Battle of Tauroento
- Battle of Telamon
- Battle of Tenedos (86 BC)
- Battle of Thapsus
- Battle of Thermae
- Battle of Thermopylae (191 BC)
- Battle of Thermopylae (254)
- Battle of Thessalonica (380)
- Battle of Thyatira
- Battle of Ticinus
- Battle of Tifernum
- Battle of Tigranocerta
- Battle of Toulouse (439)
- Battle of Toulouse (458)
- Battle of Tridentum
- Battle of Trifanum
- Battle of Turin (312)
- Battle of Tyndaris
- Battle of Tzirallum
- Battle of the Teutoburg Forest
- Battle of the Trebia
- Battle of Urumia
- Battle of Utica (49 BC)
- Battle of Utica (81 BC)
- Battle of Utica (203 BC)
- Battle of the Upper Baetis
- Battle of Valentia 75 BC
- Battle of Veii
- Battle of Vellica
- Battle of Vercellae
- Battle of Verona (249)
- Battle of Verona (312)
- Battle of Verona (402)
- Battle of Vesontio (68)
- Battle of Vesuvius
- Battle of Vicus Helena
- Battle of Vindalium
- Battle of Vindonissa
- Battle of Vosges (58 BC)
- Battle of the Willows
- Battle of Zama
- Battle of Zela
- Battle of Zela (67 BC)
- Belgae
- Bellum Batonianum
- Bellum Octavianum
- Bellum Siculum
- Beneficiarius
- Berber kings of Roman-era Tunisia
- Berlanga Cup
- Berytus
- Bes (coin)
- Bestiarius
- Bidental
- Bierzo Edict
- Biga (chariot)
- Bigatus
- Birrus
- Birth registration in ancient Rome
- Bithynia and Pontus
- Blacas Cameo
- Black-burnished ware
- Blanda (city)
- Blavia castellum
- Blestium
- Bona Dea
- Bonus pater familias
- Borders of the Roman Empire
- Bosham Head
- Boudican revolt
- Bovillae
- Boxford Roman mosaic
- Braccae
- Bread and circuses
- Bridge at Nimreh
- Bridge near Kemer
- Bridge near Limyra
- Bridge of Augustus (Narni)
- Bridgeness Slab
- Britannia Prima
- Britannia Secunda
- Britannicus
- British Latin
- Bronze colossus of Constantine
- Brumalia
- Buccina
- Bucellarii
- Bulla (amulet)
- Burgus
- Bustuarius
- Byzacena

== C ==
- Caecuban wine
- Caelian Hill
- Caere
- Caernarfon Mithraeum
- Caesar (title)
- Caesar cut
- Caesar's Civil War
- Caesar's Comet
- Caesar's Rhine bridges
- Caesarea in Mauretania
- Caesarus
- Cage cup
- Caietae Portus
- Caladrius
- Calama (Numidia)
- Calceus
- Caldaccoli Aqueduct
- Caldarium
- Caledonia
- Calends
- Caligae
- Caligula
- Caligula's Giant Ship
- Calisia
- Calligraphus
- Caltrop
- Calumnia (Roman law)
- Cameo glass
- Cameo with Valerian and Shapur I
- Camp crown
- Camp of Diocletian
- Campaign history of the Roman military
- Campana reliefs
- Campus Agrippae
- Campus Martius
- Camulodunum
- Canaba
- Canal of Drusus
- Cancellarii
- Cancelleria Reliefs
- Caños de Carmona
- Canovium
- Cantabrian circle
- Cantabrian stelae
- Cantabrian Wars
- Cantabrum
- Capax imperii nisi imperasset
- Capitatio-Iugatio
- Capite censi
- Capitis deminutio
- Capitoline Base
- Capitoline Brutus
- Capitoline Games
- Capitoline Hill
- Capitoline Temple
- Capitoline Triad
- Capitoline of Colonia Ulpia Traiana
- Capitolium of Brixia
- Capitolium Vetus
- Cappadocia (Roman province)
- Caprasia
- Caprotinia
- Capture of Carthage (439)
- Capture of Fidenae (435 BC)
- Capture of Malta (218 BC)
- Capture of Neapolis
- Car Dyke
- Caracalla
- Caratacus's last battle
- Carausian revolt
- Cardiff Roman Fort
- Cardo
- Carinae
- Carinus
- Caristia
- Carmen (verse)
- Carmen Arvale
- Carmen Saeculare
- Carmen Saliare
- Carmentalia
- Carnuntum
- Carpi (Africa)
- Carroballista
- Carthage amphitheatre
- Carthage Treasure
- Carthaginian peace
- Carthago delenda est
- Carus
- Casa Romuli
- Casal Rotondo
- Cassius Dio
- Castel Sant'Angelo
- Castellum
- Castellum Dimmidi
- Castellum Iabar
- Castellum Minus
- Castellum Tingitii
- Castor and Pollux (Prado)
- Castra
- Castra ad Fluvium Frigidum
- Castra Alteium
- Castra Nova equitum singularium
- Castra Traiana (castra)
- Castra of ancient Rome
- Castra of Târsa
- Castra Peregrina
- Castra Praetoria
- Castrum Album
- Castus (rebel)
- Catacomb of Calepodius
- Catacomb of Callixtus
- Catacombs of Domitilla
- Catacombs of Generosa
- Catacombs of Marcellinus and Peter
- Catacombs of Rome
- Catacombs of San Valentino
- Catapulta
- Cataractonium
- Catilinarian conspiracy
- Catiline
- Catiline Orations
- Cato the Elder
- Cato the Younger
- Catullus
- Caucasian campaign of Pompey
- Caucenus
- Cautelary jurisprudence
- Cavaedium
- Cavea
- Celemantia
- Celeres
- Cella
- Cellars of Diocletian's Palace
- Celtiberian Wars
- Cena
- Centenarium
- Centenionalis
- Centesima rerum venalium
- Centum Cellas
- Centum Prata
- Centumviral court
- Centuria
- Centuriate Assembly
- Centuriation
- Centurion
- Cerealia
- Ceres (mythology)
- Cerrato Cellars
- Certinae (castra)
- Cervula
- Cessio bonorum
- Cestus
- Chaplet (headgear)
- Chariot racing
- Chedworth Roman Villa
- Cheiroballistra
- Chester city walls
- Chester Roman Amphitheatre
- Chesters Bridge
- Childhood in ancient Rome
- Chiton (garment)
- Chorobates
- Christianization of the Roman Empire as diffusion of innovation
- Chronograph of 354
- Chronology of warfare between the Romans and Germanic tribes
- Cicero
- CIL 4.5296
- Cilicia (Roman province)
- Cilician pirates
- Cilurnum
- Cimbrian War
- Cincari
- Cingulum militare
- Cippus
- Circesium
- Circus Flaminius
- Circus Games Mosaic
- Circus Maximus
- Circus Varianus
- Circus of Antioch
- Circus of Carthage
- Circus of Maxentius
- Circus of Nero
- Cirencester Amphitheatre
- Cisterns of the Roman Baths, Beirut
- Civic Crown
- Civil wars of the Tetrarchy
- Civis romanus sum
- Civitas
- Civitas foederata
- Civitas sine suffragio
- Civitas stipendaria
- Civitas Tungrorum
- Clades Lolliana
- Clarigation
- Classe, ancient port of Ravenna
- Classical Latin
- Classis Britannica
- Classis Germanica
- Classis Misenensis
- Classis Flavia Moesica
- Classis Ravennas
- Clastidium
- Claudia gens
- Claudian letters
- Claudius
- Claudius' expulsion of Jews from Rome
- Claudius Gothicus
- Clausentum
- Clausula (rhetoric)
- Cleon (revolted slave)
- Clibanarii
- Climate of ancient Rome
- Clipeus
- Clivus Capitolinus
- Clivus Palatinus
- Clivus Scauri
- Clivus Suburanus
- Cloaca Circi Maximi
- Cloaca Maxima
- Clodius
- Clodius Albinus
- Clothing in ancient Rome
- Cluilian trench
- Clunia, Austria
- Codex Gregorianus
- Coele Syria (Roman province)
- Coenaculum
- Coggabata
- Cohort (military unit)
- Cohors I Aelia Dacorum
- Cohors I Aelia Gaesatorum milliaria sagitt
- Cohors I Alpinorum equitata
- Cohors I Alpinorum peditata
- Cohors I Antiochensium equitata
- Cohors I Aquitanorum
- Cohors I Aquitanorum veterana
- Cohors I Asturum et Callaecorum
- Cohors I Aurelia Antonina Hemesenorum milliaria
- Cohors I Batavorum milliaria c.R. pf
- Cohors I Bracaraugustanorum eq c.R.
- Cohors I Brittonum milliaria
- Cohors I Cananefatium
- Cohors I Cretum sagittaria
- Cohors I Cypria c.R.
- Cohors I Delmatarum
- Cohors I Delmatarum milliaria equitata
- Cohors I Flavia Canathenorum
- Cohors I Flavia Commagenorum equitata
- Cohors I Flavia Ulpia Hispanorum miliaria eq c.R.
- Cohors I Germanorum
- Cohors I Hispanorum pia fidelis
- Cohors I Raetorum
- Cohors I Raetorum equitata
- Cohors I Ubiorum
- Cohors I Ulpia Dacorum
- Cohors I Ulpia Galatarum
- Cohors I Vangionum Milliaria Equitata
- Cohors II Alpinorum equitata
- Cohors II Aquitanorum equitata c.R.
- Cohors II Asturum et Callaecorum
- Cohors II Delmatarum
- Cohors II Gallorum Dacica equitata
- Cohors II Gallorum veterana equitata
- Cohors II Hispanorum peditata
- Cohors II Italica Civium Romanorum
- Cohors II Lucensium
- Cohors III Alpinorum equitata
- Cohors III Aquitanorum equitata c.R.
- Cohors III Delmatarum equitata c.R. pf
- Cohors III Ulpia Petraeorum
- Cohors IV Aquitanorum equitata c.R.
- Cohors IV Baetica
- Cohors IV Delmatarum
- Cohors IV Gallorum equitata
- Cohors IV Tungrorum
- Cohors V Delmatarum
- Cohors V Delmatarum c.R.
- Cohors VI Delmatarum equitata
- Cohors VI Nerviorum
- Cohors VI Thracum quingenaria equitata
- Cohors VII Delmatarum equitata
- Cohors XX Palmyrenorum
- Cohors amicorum
- Cohortes urbanae
- Coinage of the Social War (91–88 BC)
- Coinage reform of Augustus
- Collatio lustralis
- College of Pontiffs
- Collegium (ancient Rome)
- Colonia (Roman)
- Colonia Claudia Ara Agrippinensium
- Colonial forum of Tarraco
- Colonne di San Lorenzo
- Colonus (person)
- Colosseum
- Colossus of Constantine
- Colossus of Nero
- Columbaria of Vigna Codini
- Columbarium
- Columbarium of Pomponius Hylas
- Column of Antoninus Pius
- Column of Arcadius
- Column of Constantine
- Column of Leo
- Column of Marcian
- Column of Marcus Aurelius
- Column of Phocas
- Columna Maenia
- Comagena
- Comes
- Comes Britanniarum
- Comes rerum privatarum
- Comes sacrarum largitionum
- Comitatenses
- Comitium
- Commercium (Roman)
- Commodus
- Commodus as Hercules
- Compascuus
- Compitalia
- Compulsor
- Concangis
- Conchylia cup
- Concilium provinciae
- Concubinatus
- Condercum
- Condictio
- Condictio causa data causa non secuta
- Condictio indebiti
- Conditum
- Confarreatio
- Conflict of the Orders
- Congiarium
- Congius
- Conímbriga
- Conisterium
- Consilium principis
- Consistorium
- Consortium imperii
- Constantine the Great
- Constantine the Great and Christianity
- Constantine II (emperor)
- Constantine III (Western Roman emperor)
- Constantine's Bridge (Danube)
- Constantine's Bridge (Mysia)
- Constantinian bronzes
- Constantinian dynasty
- Constantinian shift
- Constantinianism
- Constantius Chlorus
- Constantius II
- Constantius III
- Constitutio Antoniniana
- Constitution (Roman law)
- Constitution of the Late Roman Empire
- Constitution of the Roman Empire
- Constitution of the Roman Kingdom
- Constitution of the Roman Republic
- Constitutional reforms of Augustus
- Constitutional reforms of Julius Caesar
- Constitutional reforms of Sulla
- Consualia
- Consuegra Dam
- Consular tribune
- Consularis
- Contio
- Contorniate
- Controversia
- Contubernium
- Contubernium (Roman army unit)
- Conventus Bracarensis
- Conventus iuridicus
- Conventus lucensis
- Coolus helmet
- Corbridge Lion
- Coria (Corbridge)
- Corinium Dobunnorum
- Cornalvo Dam
- Cornelia gens
- Cornicen
- Corniculary
- Cornuti
- Corocotta
- Corrector
- Corvus (boarding device)
- Cosmetics in ancient Rome
- Cotyla
- Council of the Seven Provinces
- Cowbridge (Roman town)
- Crambeck Ware
- Cramond Lioness
- Crepundia
- Crete and Cyrenaica
- Criobolium
- Crisis of the Roman Republic
- Crisis of the Third Century
- Crixus
- Crosby Garrett Helmet
- Crossing of the Rhine
- Crossing the Rubicon
- Crown of justification
- Crupellarius
- Crustumerium
- Cryptoporticus
- Cubicularius
- Culture of ancient Rome
- Cuneus Frisionum
- Cura Annonae
- Curator Aquarum
- Curia
- Curia Calabra
- Curia Cornelia
- Curia Hostilia
- Curia Julia
- Curia of Pompey
- Curiales
- Curiate Assembly
- Curius and Apuleius
- Cursus honorum
- Cursus publicus
- Curule seat

== D ==
- Dacia Aureliana
- Dacia Mediterranea
- Dacia Ripensis
- Dacian Draco
- Dacian warfare
- Dacicus
- Daco-Roman
- Dalmatia (Roman province)
- Damnatio ad bestias
- Damnatio memoriae
- Damnum iniuria datum
- Danube–Iller–Rhine Limes
- Danubian Limes
- Danubian provinces
- Danum shield
- Dardania (Roman province)
- De architectura
- De arte aleae
- De verborum significatione
- Decanus
- Decapolis
- Decarch (military rank)
- December (Roman month)
- Decemvirate (Twelve Tables)
- Decemviri
- Decemviri stlitibus judicandis
- Decennalia
- Decennalia (column)
- Decian persecution
- Decimation (punishment)
- Decius
- Decumanus (Roman city)
- Decumanus Maximus
- Decurio
- Decurion (Roman cavalry officer)
- Decury
- Dediticii
- Defeat of Boudica
- Deforestation during the Roman period
- Delator
- Democratic elements of Roman Republic
- Demography of the Roman Empire
- Denarius
- Denarius of L. Censorinus
- Dentistry in ancient Rome
- Deposition of Romulus Augustus
- Derventio Coritanorum
- Deva Victrix
- Devil's Dykes
- Devotio
- Di inferi
- Di Penates
- Diadumenian
- Dictator perpetuo
- Didius Julianus
- Dies lustricus
- Dies sanguinis
- Diffarreation
- Dignitas (Roman concept)
- Dimachaerus
- Dimensuratio provinciarum and Divisio orbis terrarum
- Diocletian
- Diocletian's Palace
- Diocletian window
- Diocletianic Persecution
- Diocletianopolis (Thrace)
- Dīs Pater
- Disability in ancient Rome
- Discens
- Disease in Imperial Rome
- Dius Fidius
- Divalia
- Divi filius
- Dodrans
- Dogs of Roman Britain
- Dolabra
- Dolaucothi Gold Mines
- Dolium
- Domesticus (Roman Empire)
- Dominate
- Domitian
- Domitian II
- Domitian's Dacian War
- Domus
- Domus Augustana
- Domus Aurea
- Domus Eirene
- Domus Severiana
- Domus Tiberiana
- Domus Transitoria
- Donations of Alexandria
- Donativum
- Double sestertius
- Draco (military standard)
- Draconarius
- Drepana
- Dromedarii
- Drusus Caesar
- Drusus Julius Caesar
- Drususstein
- Dubris
- Duella
- Duenos inscription
- Duino Mithraeum
- Duplarius
- Dupondius
- Durnovaria
- Durocornovium
- Durocortorum
- Duroliponte
- Durovernum Cantiacorum
- Duumviri
- Duumviri navales
- Dux
- Dux Belgicae secundae
- Dux Britanniarum

== E ==
- Early life of Augustus
- Early Roman army
- East Roman army
- Eastern sigillata A
- Eastern sigillata B
- Eastern sigillata C
- Eastern sigillata D
- Ebora Liberalitas Julia
- Eboracum
- Ebro Treaty
- Eburobrittium
- Economics of the Roman army
- Economy of Hispania
- Edict of Milan
- Edict of Serdica
- Edict of Thessalonica
- Edict on Maximum Prices
- Education in ancient Rome
- Eifel Aqueduct
- Elagabalium
- Elagabalus
- Elagabalus (deity)
- Elaiussa Sebaste
- Elections in the Roman Republic
- Emesa helmet
- Emona
- End of Roman rule in Britain
- Ennion
- Epidia gens
- Epirus (Roman province)
- Epithets of Jupiter
- Epulones
- Epulum Jovis
- Equestrian Statue of Marcus Aurelius
- Equirria
- Equites
- Equites cataphractarii
- Equites Dalmatae
- Equites singulares Augusti
- Equites Stablesiani
- Equitius (consul)
- Equus publicus
- Ergastulum
- Ermita de la Virgen del Pilar Dam
- Erotic art in Pompeii and Herculaneum
- Esparragalejo Dam
- Esquiline Hill
- Esquiline Necropolis
- Esquiline Treasure
- Essedarius
- Et facere et pati fortia Romanum est
- Eugenius
- Eunus
- Euphratensis
- Eurymedon Bridge (Aspendos)
- Eurymedon Bridge (Selge)
- Evocati Augusti
- Evocatus
- Executive magistrates of the Roman Kingdom
- Executive magistrates of the Roman Empire
- Executive magistrates of the Roman Republic
- Exedra
- Exile of Ovid
- Exoletus
- Exploratores
- Extraordinarii

== F ==
- Fabian strategy
- Fabula crepidata
- Fabula palliata
- Fabula togata
- Factorum ac dictorum memorabilium libri IX
- Falacrine
- Falarica
- Falernian wine
- Fall of Hatra
- Fall of the Western Roman Empire
- Falling (execution)
- Falx
- Family in ancient Rome
- Family tree of Roman emperors
- Farnese Diadumenos
- Fascinus
- Fasti
- Fasti (poem)
- Fasti Antiates Maiores
- Fasti Capitolini
- Fasti Ostienses
- Fasti Potentini
- Fasti Triumphales
- Fasti vindobonenses
- Fauces (architecture)
- Faun
- Faunus
- Faustinopolis
- Faustulus
- Fayum mummy portraits
- Febris
- Februarius
- Fectio
- Felicior Augusto, melior Traiano
- Felicissimus
- Femoralia
- Feralia
- Feretrius
- Feriae Latinae
- Feriale Duranum
- Fescennine Verses
- Fetial
- Fibula (penile)
- Ficus Ruminalis
- Fideicommissum
- Fimbrian legions
- Firefighting in ancient Rome
- Firmus
- First Battle of Clusium (82 BC)
- First Celtiberian War
- First Council of Nicaea
- First Dacian War
- First Jewish–Roman War
- First Macedonian War
- First Mithridatic War
- First Punic War
- First secessio plebis
- First Servile War
- First Triumvirate
- Fiscus
- Fiscus Judaicus
- Fishbourne Roman Palace
- Five-Columns Monument
- Flaccus (composer)
- Flamen
- Flamen Dialis
- Flamen Divi Julii
- Flamen Martialis
- Flamen Quirinalis
- Flaminio Obelisk
- Flavia Caesariensis
- Flavian Amphitheater (Pozzuoli)
- Flavian art
- Flavian dynasty
- Flavian Palace
- Fleet coinage (Mark Antony)
- Flora (mythology)
- Floralia
- Florentia (Roman city)
- Florianus
- Focale
- Foederati
- Foedus Cassianum
- Follis
- Food and diet in ancient medicine
- Food and dining in the Roman Empire
- Font de Mussa Mosaic
- Fontus
- Forced suicide
- Fordicidia
- Foreign influences on Pompeii
- Formula togatorum
- Fornacalia
- Fortuna
- Forum (Roman)
- Forum Appii
- Forum Baths
- Forum Boarium
- Forum civilium
- Forum Clodii
- Forum Hadriani
- Forum Holitorium
- Forum Piscarium
- Forum Pistorium
- Forum Suarium
- Forum venalium
- Forum Vinarium
- Forum of Arcadius
- Forum of Augustus
- Forum of Caesar
- Forum of Constantine
- Forum of Nerva
- Forum of Theodosius
- Forum of the Ox
- Fossa Corbulonis
- Fossa Mariana
- Fossa Regia
- Fossatum Africae
- Fosse Way
- Founding of Rome
- Fountain of the Idol
- Four seasons altar of Würzburg
- Fractio Panis
- Fragmenta Vaticana
- Fregellae's revolt
- Frigidarium
- Frontinus
- Fructus (Roman law)
- Frumentarii
- Fullo
- Fumarium
- Funerary Monument of Lusius Storax
- Furrinalia
- Furtum
- Fustuarium

== G ==
- Gabiniani
- Gadara Aqueduct
- Gaianum
- Gaius (praenomen)
- Gaius Caesar
- Gaius Calpurnius Piso (conspirator)
- Gaius Cassius Longinus
- Gaius Julius Caesar (name)
- Gaius Julius Iullus (consul 489 BC)
- Gaius Julius Vindex
- Gaius Maecenas
- Gaius Marius
- Gaius Mamilius Limetanus
- Gaius Nymphidius Sabinus
- Gaius Suetonius Paulinus
- Galatia (Roman province)
- Galatian War
- Galba
- Galea (helmet)
- Galerius
- Galilee campaign (67)
- Gallaecia
- Gallia Aquitania
- Gallia Belgica
- Gallia Lugdunensis
- Gallia Narbonensis
- Gallic Empire
- Gallic Wars
- Gallienus
- Gallienus usurpers
- Gallo-Roman culture
- Gannicus
- Gardens of Lucullus
- Gardens of Maecenas
- Gardens of Sallust
- Garum
- Gates of hell
- Gellia gens
- Gemarrin Bridge
- Gemma Augustea
- Gemma Claudia
- Gemonian stairs
- Genius (mythology)
- Genius loci
- Gens
- Geopolitics of the Roman Empire
- Geoponici
- German and Sarmatian campaigns of Constantine
- Germania
- Germania Antiqua
- Germania Inferior
- Germania Superior
- Germanic–Roman contacts
- Germanicus
- Gerulata
- Geta (emperor)
- Għajn Tuffieħa Roman Baths
- Gildonic War
- Gisacum
- Gladiator
- Gladiator Mosaic
- Gladius
- Glanum
- Glanum Dam
- Glevum
- Glirarium
- Glossary of ancient Roman culture
- Glossary of ancient Roman religion
- Glycerius
- Gnaeus Domitius Ahenobarbus (father of Nero)
- Gnaeus Pompeius Magnus (son of Pompey)
- Gnaeus Octavius (consul 87 BC)
- Gonio Fortress
- Gordian I
- Gordian II
- Gordian III
- Gordian dynasty
- Gothic War (376–382)
- Gracchi
- Graecostasis
- Grass Crown
- Gratus
- Grave relief of Publius Aiedius and Aiedia
- Great Antonine Altar
- Great Cameo of France
- Great Colonnade at Apamea
- Great Conspiracy
- Great Fire of Rome
- Gratian
- Gravitas
- Great Altar of Hercules
- Greave
- Greco-Roman hairstyle
- Greece in the Roman era
- Green Caesar
- Groma (surveying)
- Gromatici
- Gubernaculum
- Guilford Puteal
- Guisborough Helmet

== H ==
- Hadrian
- Hadrian's Gate
- Hadrian's Library
- Hadrian's Villa
- Hadrian's Wall
- Hadriani ad Olympum
- Hadrianopolis (Epirus)
- Hadrianopolis (Phrygia)
- Hadrianopolis in Paphlagonia
- Hadrianotherae
- Hairstyles in ancient Rome
- Hallaton Helmet
- Hammam Essalihine
- Hannibal
- Hannibal's Bridge
- Hannibal's crossing of the Alps
- Harbaqa Dam
- Harpastum
- Haruspex
- Hasta (spear)
- Hasta pura (military decoration)
- Hastati
- Hastiliarius
- Heidentor
- Helm of Cannae
- Helmet of Constantine
- Helvetii
- Herculean Sarcophagus of Genzano
- Hercules in ancient Rome
- Herennius Etruscus
- Hermes (Museo Pio-Clementino)
- Heruli (military unit)
- Hiberno-Roman relations
- Hıdırlık Tower
- Hierapolis sawmill
- Hilaria
- Hinton St Mary Mosaic
- Hippika gymnasia
- Hippocras
- Hippodrome of Berytus
- Hipposandal
- Hispania Baetica
- Hispania Balearica
- Hispania Carthaginensis
- Hispania Citerior
- Hispania Tarraconensis
- Hispania Ulterior
- Historia Augusta
- History of Roman-era Tunisia
- History of the Constitution of the Late Roman Empire
- History of the Constitution of the Roman Empire
- History of the Constitution of the Roman Kingdom
- History of the Constitution of the Roman Republic
- History of the Later Roman Empire
- History of the Roman Constitution
- History of the Roman Empire
- History of the Romans in Arabia
- Homo sacer
- Homosexuality in ancient Rome
- Honesta missio
- Honestiores and humiliores
- Honorius (emperor)
- Honos
- Hoplomachus
- Horace
- Horatii and Curiatii
- Horrea Galbae
- Horreum
- Horti Aciliorum
- Horti Agrippinae
- Horti Caesaris
- Horti Domitiae
- Horti Lamiani
- Horti Liciniani
- Horti Lolliani
- Horti Pompeiani
- Horti Tauriani
- Hospitium
- Hostilia gens
- Hostilian
- Hostus Hostilius
- House of Augustus
- House of Julia Felix
- House of Loreius Tiburtinus
- House of Menander
- House of Sallust
- House of the Cascade
- House of the Centenary
- House of the Faun
- House of the Prince of Naples
- House of the Silver Wedding
- House of the Surgeon
- House of the Tragic Poet
- House of the Vestals
- House of the Vettii
- Housesteads Roman Fort
- Hypocaust
- Hypogeum

== I ==
- Ianuarius
- Iberian–Armenian War
- Ides of March
- Idistaviso
- Idolino
- Igel Column
- Iguvine Tablets
- Ilkley Roman Fort
- Illyrian emperors
- Illyricum (Roman province)
- Imaginifer
- Imago clipeata
- Imbrex and tegula
- Immunes
- Imperator
- Imperial estate (Roman)
- Imperial fora
- Imperial helmet
- Imperial Limes Commission
- Imperial province
- Imperial Roman army
- Imperium
- Impluvium
- Imporcitor
- In hoc signo vinces
- Inaugural games of the Flavian Amphitheatre
- Incitatus
- Indibilis and Mandonius
- Indiction
- Indigitamenta
- Indo-Roman trade relations
- Infamia
- Ingenui
- Iniuria
- Institutio Oratoria
- Insula (building)
- Insula (Roman city)
- Insula dell'Ara Coeli
- Interdictum de homine libero exhibendo
- Interrex
- Invidia
- Irgenhausen Castrum
- Isca Augusta
- Isca Dumnoniorum
- Isis (ship)
- Islands (Roman province)
- Isurium Brigantum
- Italica
- Itineraries of the Roman emperors, 337–363
- Itinerarium
- Iturissa
- Iturranduz Dam
- Iunius (month)
- Ius Italicum
- Ius naturale
- Ius non scriptum
- Ius privatum
- Ius publicum
- Ius scriptum
- Ius singulare

== J ==
- Jajce Mithraeum
- Janus
- Joannes
- Jovian (emperor)
- Jovians and Herculians
- Judaea (Roman province)
- Jugerum
- Jugurthine War
- Julia gens
- Julian (emperor)
- Julian calendar
- Julian's Persian expedition
- Julii Caesares
- Julio-Claudian dynasty
- Julio-Claudian family tree
- Julius Caesar
- Julius Caesar's invasions of Britain
- Julius Caesar's planned invasion of the Parthian Empire
- Julius Nepos
- Juno (mythology)
- Juno Ludovisi
- Jupiter (mythology)
- Jupiter Column
- Jupiter Dolichenus
- Jupiter Indiges
- Jupiter Stone
- Jus gentium
- Jus trium liberorum
- Jusselle
- Justice of Trajan
- Justitium
- Juvenal
- Juvenalia

== K ==
- Kalybe (temple)
- Kasserine Dam
- Kastell Wörth
- Kharaba Bridge
- King of Rome
- Kingdom of Cappadocia
- Kingdom of Hatra
- Kitos War
- Klinē
- Knag Burn Gateway

== L ==
- La Pared de los Moros
- Labarum
- Labrum (architecture)
- Laconicum
- Lactodurum
- Lacus Curtius
- Lacus Juturnae
- Laelian
- Laeti
- Lagentium
- Lake Homs Dam
- Lamas Aqueduct
- Lampadarius
- Lancea (weapon)
- Land reform in the Roman republic
- Languages of the Roman Empire
- Lanuvium
- Lanx
- Lapis manalis
- Lapis Niger
- Laquearius
- Larentalia
- Lares
- Lares Familiares
- Largiana (castra)
- Largo di Torre Argentina
- Last of the Romans
- Last words of Julius Caesar
- Latakia Tetraporticus
- Late Roman army
- Late Roman ridge helmet
- Later Roman Empire
- Laterculus
- Laterculus Veronensis
- Laticlave
- Latifundium
- Latin alphabet
- Latin indirect speech
- Latin League
- Latin Rights
- Latin War
- Latin War (498–493 BC)
- Latinus
- Latium adiectum
- Latrocinium
- Laurentian Sow (sculpture)
- Laurentum
- Lautertal Limes
- Lautumiae
- Lava Treasure
- Lavinium
- Law of Citations
- Law of majestas
- Law school of Berytus
- Leahill Turret, Hadrian's Wall
- Lectisternium
- Legacy of the Roman Empire
- Legal wager
- Legatus
- Legatus Augusti pro praetore
- Leges Antoniae
- Leges Clodiae
- Leges Genuciae
- Leges provinciae
- Leges regiae
- Legio I Adiutrix
- Legio I Armeniaca
- Legio I Flavia Constantia
- Legio I Germanica
- Legio I Iovia
- Legio I Isaura Sagittaria
- Legio I Italica
- Legio I Macriana liberatrix
- Legio I Maximiana
- Legio I Minervia
- Legio I Parthica
- Legio II Adiutrix
- Legio II Armeniaca
- Legio II Augusta
- Legio II Flavia Constantia
- Legio II Flavia Virtutis
- Legio II Gallica
- Legio II Herculia
- Legio II Isaura
- Legio II Italica
- Legio II Parthica
- Legio II Traiana Fortis
- Legio III Augusta
- Legio III Cyrenaica
- Legio III Diocletiana
- Legio III Gallica
- Legio III Isaura
- Legio III Italica
- Legio III Parthica
- Legio IV Flavia Felix
- Legio IV Italica
- Legio IV Macedonica
- Legio IV Martia
- Legio IV Scythica
- Legio V Alaudae
- Legio V Iovia
- Legio V Macedonica
- Legio V Parthica
- Legio VI Ferrata
- Legio VI Herculia
- Legio VI Hispana
- Legio VI Victrix
- Legio VII Claudia
- Legio VII Gemina
- Legio VIII Augusta
- Legio IX Hispana
- Legio X Equestris
- Legio X Fretensis
- Legio X Gemina
- Legio XI
- Legio XI Claudia
- Legio XII Fulminata
- Legio XIII Gemina
- Legio XIV Gemina
- Legio XV Apollinaris
- Legio XV Primigenia
- Legio XVI Flavia Firma
- Legio XVI Gallica
- Legio XVII
- Legio XVIII
- Legio XIX
- Legio XX Valeria Victrix
- Legio XXI Rapax
- Legio XXII Deiotariana
- Legio XXII Primigenia
- Legio XXX Ulpia Victrix
- Legionary
- Legionary denarii (Mark Antony)
- Legislative Assemblies of the Roman Kingdom
- Legislative assemblies of the Roman Empire
- Legislative assemblies of the Roman Republic
- Lemures
- Lemuria (festival)
- Leo I (emperor)
- Leo II (emperor)
- Leontes Bridge
- Leptis Magna
- Les Ferreres Aqueduct
- Letocetum
- Leuconium (Pannonia)
- Leves
- Lex Acilia Calpurnia
- Lex Acilia de Intercalando
- Lex Acilia repetundarum
- Lex Aebutia de formulis
- Lex Aebutia de magistratibus extraordinariis
- Lex Aelia et Fufia
- Lex Aelia Sentia
- Lex Agraria
- Lex animata
- Lex Antonia
- Lex Antonia de Termessibus
- Lex Appuleia agraria
- Lex Appuleia de maiestate
- Lex Aquilia
- Lex Aternia Tarpeia
- Lex Atilia Marcia
- Lex Atinia
- Lex Aufeia
- Lex Aurelia de tribunicia potestate
- Lex Aurelia iudiciaria
- Lex Baebia
- Lex Caecilia de censoria
- Lex Caecilia de vectigalibus
- Lex Caecilia Didia
- Lex Calpurnia de repetundis
- Lex Canuleia
- Lex Cassia de senatu
- Lex Cincia
- Lex Claudia
- Lex Cornelia de maiestate
- Lex curiata de imperio
- Lex Fufia Caninia
- Lex Gabinia de piratis persequendis
- Lex Gellia Cornelia
- Lex Hieronica
- Lex Hortensia
- Lex Irnitana
- Lex Julia
- Lex Julia de maiestate
- Lex Junia Licinia
- Lex Junia Norbana
- Lex Licinia Mucia
- Lex Malacitana
- Lex Manciana
- Lex Manilia
- Lex non scripta
- Lex Ogulnia
- Lex Oppia
- Lex Papia Poppaea
- Lex Papiria de dedicationibus
- Lex Plaetoria
- Lex Plautia Papiria
- Lex Poetelia Papiria
- Lex Pompeia de Transpadanis
- Lex Publilia (471 BC)
- Lex Quisquis
- Lex Roscia
- Lex Roscia theatralis
- Lex Scantinia
- Lex scripta
- Lex Titia
- Lex Trebonia
- Lex Trebonia (448 BC)
- Lex Trebonia (55 BC)
- Lex Ursonensis
- Lex Valeria (82 BC)
- Lex Varia
- Lex Vatinia
- Lex Villia Annalis
- Lex Voconia
- Liber
- Liberalia
- Liberators' civil war
- Libertas
- Libius Severus
- Library of Philippopolis
- Libri lintei
- Libya in the Roman era
- Licinius
- Lictor
- Liguria (Roman province)
- Limes (Roman Empire)
- Limes Alutanus
- Limes Arabicus
- Limes Britannicus
- Limes Germanicus
- Limes Mauretaniae
- Limes Moesiae
- Limes Porolissensis
- Limes Transalutanus
- Limes Tripolitanus
- Limesfall
- Limestone Corner
- Limitanei
- Lindinis
- Lindum Colonia
- Literal contracts in Roman law
- Livy
- Local government (ancient Roman)
- Loculus (architecture)
- Loculus (satchel)
- Locus Castorum
- Londinium
- London Mithraeum
- Longovicium
- Lopen Roman Mosaic
- Lorica hamata
- Lorica plumata
- Lorica segmentata
- Lorica squamata
- Lousonna
- Lower Germanic Limes
- Luca Conference
- Lucanica
- Lucaria
- Lucentum
- Lucifer
- Lucius Antonius (brother of Mark Antony)
- Lucius Caecilius Iucundus
- Lucius Julius Caesar (consul 64 BC)
- Lucius Julius Caesar (consul 90 BC)
- Lucius Junius Brutus
- Lucius Mummius Achaicus
- Lucius Tarquinius Superbus
- Lucius Varius Rufus
- Lucius Verus
- Lucus
- Ludi
- Ludi Apollinares
- Ludi magister
- Ludi Piscatorii
- Ludi Plebeii
- Ludi Romani
- Ludi Triumphales
- Ludovisi Battle sarcophagus
- Ludus (ancient Rome)
- Ludus Dacicus
- Ludus latrunculorum
- Ludus Magnus
- Lugdunum
- Luguvalium
- Lunula (amulet)
- Lupanar
- Lupercal
- Lupercalia
- Lupercus (mythology)
- Lusitania
- Lusitanian War
- Lustratio
- Lustrum
- Lusus
- Lusus Troiae
- Lutetia
- Lutudarum
- Lycia et Pamphylia
- Lycurgus Cup
- Lyon Tablet
- Lyon-Vaise Hoard

== M ==
- Macedonia (Roman province)
- Macellum
- Macellum Liviae
- Macellum of Pompeii
- Macellum of Pozzuoli
- Macestus Bridge
- Macrinus
- Maeatae
- Maenianum
- Magerius Mosaic
- Magister equitum
- Magister militum
- Magister officiorum
- Magnentius
- Magnis (Carvoran)
- Magnus Maximus
- Main Limes
- Mainz Gladius
- Maison Carrée
- Maius
- Majorian
- Mamertine Prison
- Mamilia gens
- Mamilian commission
- Mamucium
- Mamuralia
- Mancipatio
- Manica (armguard)
- Maniple (military unit)
- Mansio
- Manus marriage
- Mappa (Roman)
- Marcellus as Hermes Logios
- Marcian
- Marcomannic Wars
- Marcus (praenomen)
- Marcus Aemilius Lepidus (triumvir)
- Marcus Aurelius
- Marcus Aurelius Marius
- Marcus Claudius Marcellus
- Marcus Furius Camillus
- Marcus Junius Brutus
- Marcus Licinius Crassus
- Marcus Livius Drusus (reformer)
- Marcus Terentius Varro
- Marcus Vipsanius Agrippa
- Mardonius (philosopher)
- Mare Nostrum
- Marforio
- Margus (city)
- Marian reforms
- Mariccus
- Mark Antony
- Marriage in ancient Rome
- Married couple funerary reliefs
- Mars (mythology)
- Martinian (emperor)
- Martius (month)
- Massacre of Catania
- Mater semper certa est
- Matilo
- Matronalia
- Mattei sarcophagus I
- Mauretania Caesariensis
- Mauretania Sitifensis
- Mauretania Tingitana
- Mausoleum of Augustus
- Mausoleum of Glanum
- Mausoleum of Helena
- Mausoleum of Honorius
- Mausoleum of Maxentius
- Maxentius
- Maxima auspicia
- Maxima Caesariensis
- Maximian
- Maximinus Daza
- Medical community of ancient Rome
- Medicine in ancient Rome
- Mediolanum
- Mediolanum (Whitchurch)
- Mediolanum Aulercorum
- Mediolanum Santonum
- Meditrinalia
- Medullia
- Megalesia
- Menologia rustica
- Mens
- Mental illness in ancient Rome
- Mercedonius
- Mercuralia
- Mercury (mythology)
- Meroë Head
- Mesopotamia (Roman province)
- Messapus
- Meta Romuli
- Meta Sudans
- Metres of Roman comedy
- Migration Period
- Milan amphitheatre
- Milecastle
- Milecastle 52
- Miliarense
- Military campaigns of Julius Caesar
- Military establishment of the Roman kingdom
- Military establishment of the Roman Republic
- Military history of ancient Rome
- Military of ancient Rome
- Military tribune
- Military Way (Hadrian's Wall)
- Milites
- Milliarium Aureum
- Milliarium of Aiton
- Minerva
- Minerva's Shrine, Chester
- Mining in ancient Rome
- Mining in Roman Britain
- Miróbriga
- Misis Bridge
- Mithraeum
- Mithraism
- Mithridatic Wars
- Moesia
- Moesia Prima
- Mola salsa
- Moneta
- Monte Testaccio
- Montefortino helmet
- Monumental Arch of Palmyra
- Moretum
- Moridunum (Carmarthen)
- Moron (ancient city)
- Mortarium
- Mos maiorum
- Muel Dam
- Mulsum (beverage)
- Munera (ancient Rome)
- Municipium
- Municipium Dardanorum
- Municipium Iasorum
- Murmillo
- Muro Dam
- Murus Romuli
- Murus Terreus
- Muscle cuirass
- Music of ancient Rome
- Mutiny at Sucro
- Myrtilis Iulia

== N ==
- Naming conventions for women in ancient Rome
- Narcissus (wrestler)
- Nascio
- Nasciturus pro iam nato habetur, quotiens de commodis eius agitur
- Naumachia
- Naumachia Vaticana
- Naval crown
- Navalia (Rome)
- Navigium Isidis
- Navis actuaria
- Navis lusoria
- Neckar-Odenwald Limes
- Negotiorum gestio
- Nemi ships
- Nemoralia
- Neocorate
- Nepotianus
- Neptunalia
- Neptune (mythology)
- Nerio
- Nero
- Nero Claudius Drusus
- Nero Julius Caesar
- Nero Redivivus legend
- Nero's exploration of the Nile
- Nerva
- Nerva–Antonine dynasty
- Netherlands in the Roman era
- New Rome
- Newstead Helmet
- Nexum
- Nicomedia
- Nijmegen Helmet
- Nobiles
- Nomen gentilicium
- Nomen nescio
- Noric steel
- Noricum
- Notitia Dignitatum
- Notitia Galliarum
- Novel (Roman law)
- November (Roman month)
- Novempopulania
- Novensiles
- Noviodunum (castra)
- Noviodunum (Switzerland)
- Novus homo
- Noxal surrender
- Numa Pompilius
- Numantia
- Numantine War
- Numen
- Numerian
- Numerius (praenomen)
- Numerius Negidius
- Numerus (Roman military unit)
- Numerus Batavorum
- Numidia (Roman province)
- Nummus
- Nundinae
- Nundinium
- Nymphaeum (Amman)
- Nysa Bridge

== O ==
- O tempora, o mores!
- Obelisk of Montecitorio
- Obélisque d'Arles
- Obligatio consensu
- Obligatio ex delicto
- Occupatio
- Octavius (praenomen)
- October (Roman month)
- October Horse
- Oculus (architecture)
- Odeon (building)
- Odeon theater (Amman)
- Odeon of Domitian
- Odeon of Herodes Atticus
- Odeon of Lyon
- Odeon of Philippopolis
- Oecus
- Oenomaus (rebel slave)
- Oescus
- Officium (ancient Rome)
- Olba Aqueduct
- Old Latin
- Old Latium
- Olicula
- Olla (Roman pot)
- Olybrius
- Olyndicus
- Omen
- Onager (weapon)
- Opera publica
- Opiconsivia
- Oplontis
- Oppian Hill
- Oppidum
- Oppidum d'Ensérune
- Optimates and populares
- Optio
- Opus (architecture)
- Opus africanum
- Opus albarium
- Opus craticum
- Opus emplectum
- Opus gallicum
- Opus incertum
- Opus isodomum
- Opus latericium
- Opus mixtum
- Opus quadratum
- Opus regulatum
- Opus reticulatum
- Opus sectile
- Opus signinum
- Opus spicatum
- Opus tessellatum
- Opus testaceum
- Opus vermiculatum
- Opus vittatum
- Orcus
- Orestes (father of Romulus Augustulus)
- Orichalcum
- Orpheus Monument
- Orpheus mosaic
- Oscilla
- Osroene (Roman province)
- Ostia Antica
- Otho
- Otium
- Ovation
- Overthrow of the Roman monarchy
- Ovid
- Ovidia gens
- Ovile
- Oxygala

== P ==
- Pact of Misenum
- Paedagogus
- Paenula
- Pagans Hill Roman temple
- Pagus
- Palace of Domitian
- Palatine
- Palatine Hill
- Palatini (Roman military)
- Palazzo a Mare
- Pales
- Palla (garment)
- Pallium (Roman cloak)
- Palmyrene Empire
- Paludamentum
- Palus Caprae
- Pamphylia
- Pannonia
- Pannonia Inferior
- Pannonia Prima
- Pannonia Savia
- Pannonia Secunda
- Pannonia Superior
- Pannonia Valeria
- Pannonian Limes
- Pantheon, Rome
- Papia gens
- Papinian
- Parabiago Plate
- Parallel Lives
- Paraphernalia
- Parazonium
- Parentalia
- Parilia
- Parma (shield)
- Parmularius (gladiator)
- Parthian Monument
- Parthian war of Caracalla
- Partiscum (castra)
- Pater familias
- Pater Patriae
- Patrician (ancient Rome)
- Patrician Torlonia
- Patronage in ancient Rome
- Pax Julia
- Pax Romana
- Peace of Nisibis (299)
- Pecunia non olet
- Penkalas Bridge
- Perduellio
- Peregrinus (Roman)
- Pergamon Bridge
- Peribolos
- Peripteros
- Persecution in Lyon
- Persecution of Christians in the Roman Empire
- Persecution of pagans in the late Roman Empire
- Perso-Roman Peace Treaty of 363
- Perso-Roman wars of 337–361
- Personal life of Cicero
- Pertinax
- Perusine War
- Pescennius Niger
- Petavonium
- Petelia
- Petronius Maximus
- Petuaria
- Petulantes
- Peucetian pottery
- Phalera (military decoration)
- Pharsalia
- Philip II (Roman emperor)
- Philip the Arab
- Philotis (mythology)
- Phocaean red slip
- Phoenice (Roman province)
- Phoenicia under Roman rule
- Pia Fidelis
- Piazzale delle Corporazioni
- Picenum
- Picus
- Piercebridge Roman Bridge
- Pietas
- Pignora imperii
- Pike Hill Signal Tower
- Pilae stacks
- Pileus (hat)
- Pillar of the Boatmen
- Pilum
- Pincian Hill
- Pincum relief
- Piscina Mirabilis
- Piscina Publica
- Pisonian conspiracy
- Placenta cake
- Plague of Cyprian
- Plancia gens
- Plato's Academy mosaic
- Plebeian Council
- Plebeians
- Plebiscitum Ovinium
- Pliny the Elder
- Plumbata
- Plutei of Trajan
- Poena cullei
- Political career of Cicero
- Political history of the Roman military
- Political institutions of ancient Rome
- Politorium
- Pollentia (Majorca)
- Pollice verso
- Pomerium
- Pompa circensis
- Pompeian era
- Pompeian–Parthian invasion of 40 BC
- Pompeian Styles
- Pompeii
- Pompey
- Pompey's Pillar (column)
- Pons Aelius
- Pons Aemilius
- Pons Agrippae
- Pons Cestius
- Pons Fabricius
- Pons Neronianus
- Pons Probi
- Pons Sublicius
- Pont Ambroix
- Pont d'Aël
- Pont de Bornègre
- Pont de Pierre (Aosta)
- Pont des Marchands
- Pont Flavien
- Pont Julien
- Pont-Saint-Martin (bridge)
- Pont Serme
- Pont sur la Laye
- Ponte Altinate
- Ponte Corvo (bridge)
- Ponte da Cava da Velha
- Ponte de Gimonde
- Ponte de Rubiães
- Ponte dei Saraceni, Adrano
- Ponte del Gran Caso
- Ponte di Pioraco
- Ponte di Quintodecimo
- Ponte di Tiberio (Rimini)
- Ponte Lucano
- Ponte Milvio
- Ponte Molino (Padua)
- Ponte Nomentano
- Ponte Pietra (Verona)
- Ponte San Lorenzo
- Ponte Sant'Angelo
- Ponte Sisto
- Pontia gens
- Pontifex maximus
- Pontiff
- Popina
- Poplifugia
- Porta Appia
- Porta Ardeatina
- Porta Asinaria
- Porta Aurelia-Sancti Petri
- Porta Caelimontana
- Porta Capena
- Porta Carmentalis
- Porta Collina
- Porta del Popolo
- Porta Fontinalis
- Porta Gemina
- Porta Latina
- Porta Maggiore
- Porta Maggiore Basilica
- Porta Metronia
- Porta Nomentana
- Porta Pinciana
- Porta Portese
- Porta Querquetulana
- Porta Salaria
- Porta San Pancrazio
- Porta San Paolo
- Porta San Sebastiano
- Porta Settimiana
- Porta Tiburtina
- Porta Trigemina
- Porta Viminale
- Porte de Mars
- Portgate
- Portico Dii Consentes
- Portico of Pompey
- Porticus Aemilia
- Porticus Argonautarum
- Porticus Catuli
- Porticus Margaritaria
- Porticus Octavia
- Porticus Octaviae
- Porticus Vipsania
- Porticus of Livia
- Portland Vase
- Portonaccio sarcophagus
- Portrait of Caracalla
- Portrait of Terentius Neo
- Portunus (mythology)
- Portus
- Portus Cale
- Portus Lemanis
- Posca
- Post-reform radiate
- Postumus
- Postumus the Younger
- Potentia (ancient city)
- Potestas
- Praefectus annonae
- Praefectus castrorum
- Praefectus urbi
- Praefectus vigilum
- Praenomen
- Praepositus sacri cubiculi
- Praeses
- Praetexta
- Praetor
- Praetor's Edict
- Praetorian Guard
- Praetorian prefect
- Praetorian prefecture
- Praetorian prefecture of Africa
- Praetorian prefecture of Gaul
- Praetorian prefecture of Illyricum
- Praetorian prefecture of Italy
- Praetorian prefecture of the East
- Praetorians Relief
- Praetorium
- Praetorium Agrippinae
- Praevalitana
- Primani
- Primicerius
- Primus inter pares
- Primus pilus
- Princeps
- Princeps prior
- Princeps senatus
- Principate
- Principes
- Priscus Attalus
- Prisons in ancient Rome
- Privatus
- Pro Archia Poeta
- Pro Caecina
- Pro Caelio
- Pro Cluentio
- Pro Milone
- Pro Tullio
- Probus (emperor)
- Proconsul
- Procopius (usurper)
- Proculeian school
- Procurator (ancient Rome)
- Profectio
- Promagistrate
- Propaganda in Augustan Rome
- Prorogatio
- Proserpina Dam
- Prostitution in ancient Rome
- Protectores Augusti Nostri
- Providentia
- Province of Apulia and Calabria
- Provincial forum of Tarraco
- Pseudo-athlete
- Pseudocomitatenses
- Pteruges
- Publican
- Publilian laws
- Publius Quinctilius Varus
- Puente de Alcántara
- Puente Romano, Mérida
- Puerta de Toledo (Zaragoza)
- Pugio
- Pula Arena
- Pullularius
- Puls (food)
- Punic Wars
- Punicus
- Pupienus
- Purpurin (glass)
- Puteal
- Puteal Scribonianum
- Puticuli
- Puy Foradado Dam
- Pyramid of Cestius

== Q ==
- Quadragesima Galliarum
- Quadrans
- Quadriga
- Quadrigatus
- Quadrumvirs
- Quaestor
- Quaestor sacri palatii
- Quaestura exercitus
- Quartia gens
- Queen of Bithynia
- Quietus
- Quinaria
- Quinarius
- Quinctia gens
- Quincunx (Roman coin)
- Quindecimviri sacris faciundis
- Quinquatria
- Quinquennial Neronia
- Quintilis
- Quintillus
- Quintus (praenomen)
- Quintus Aemilius Laetus
- Quintus Caecilius Metellus Numidicus
- Quintus Caecilius Metellus Pius Scipio
- Quintus Fabius Maximus Verrucosus
- Quintus Lollius Urbicus
- Quintus Tullius Cicero
- Quirinal Hill
- Quirinus
- Quirites

== R ==
- Rabirius (architect)
- Raetia
- Rape of the Sabine Women
- Rapina
- Ratae Corieltauvorum
- Ratiaria
- Rationalis
- Ravenglass Roman Bath House
- Real contracts in Roman law
- Recitationes
- Rediculus
- Regalianus
- Regia
- Regifugium
- Regii
- Regio I Porta Capena
- Regio II Caelimontium
- Regio III Isis et Serapis
- Regio IV Templum Pacis
- Regio V Esquiliae
- Regio VI Alta Semita
- Regio VII Via Lata
- Regio VIII Forum Romanum
- Regio IX Circus Flaminius
- Regio X Palatium
- Regio XI Circus Maximus
- Regio XII Piscina Publica
- Regio XIII Aventinus
- Regio XIV Transtiberim
- Regulbium
- Rei vindicatio
- Reign of Marcus Aurelius
- Reka Devnia Hoard
- Relegatio
- Religio
- Religion in ancient Rome
- Religious persecution in the Roman Empire
- Religious policies of Constantine the Great
- Remoria
- Reparator
- Res communis
- Res derelictae
- Res divina
- Res extra commercium
- Res Gestae Divi Augusti
- Res mancipi
- Res nullius
- Res publica
- Responsa
- Restitutio ad integrum
- Retiarius
- Reverse overshot water wheel
- Revolt of the Batavi
- Rex Sacrorum
- Rhabdion
- Ribchester Helmet
- Ricimer
- Ring of Silvianus
- Robigalia
- Rogatio
- Rogatio Aufidia de ambitu
- Roma (mythology)
- Roma quadrata
- Roman abacus
- Roman-Aequian wars
- Roman Africans
- Roman Amphitheatre of Cagliari
- Roman Amphitheatre of Florence
- Roman amphitheatre of Italica
- Roman amphitheatre of Syracuse
- Roman aqueduct
- Roman aqueducts of Toledo
- Roman arch of Medinaceli
- Roman architectural revolution
- Roman Armenia
- Roman army
- Roman army in Dacia
- Roman army of the late Republic
- Roman army of the mid-Republic
- Roman art
- Roman assemblies
- Roman auxiliaries in Britain
- Roman Baths (Bath)
- Roman Baths, Beirut
- Roman Baths of Ankara
- Roman baths of Toledo
- Roman–Bosporan War
- Roman brick
- Roman bridge
- Roman Bridge (Saint-Thibéry)
- Roman Bridge (Trier)
- Roman Bridge (Vaison-la-Romaine)
- Roman bridge of Ávila
- Roman Bridge of Catribana
- Roman Bridge of Chaves
- Roman bridge of Córdoba
- Roman bridge of Lugo
- Roman bridge of Salamanca
- Roman bridge of Talamanca de Jarama
- Roman Britain
- Roman calendar
- Roman camp, Marktbreit
- Roman campaigns in Germania (12 BC – AD 16)
- Roman Carthage
- Roman cavalry
- Roman censor
- Roman circus
- Roman circus of Mérida
- Roman circus of Toledo
- Roman cities in Britain
- Roman cities in Portugal
- Roman citizenship
- Roman civil war of 350–353
- Roman client kingdoms in Britain
- Roman colonies in Berber Africa
- Roman command structure during First Mithridatic War
- Roman commerce
- Roman concrete
- Roman conquest of Anglesey
- Roman conquest of Britain
- Roman conquest of the Hernici
- Roman conquest of the Iberian Peninsula
- Roman Constitution
- Roman consul
- Roman Cumbria
- Roman currency
- Roman cursive
- Roman Dacia
- Roman–Dalmatian wars
- Roman Dam of Belas
- Roman Dam of Fonte Coberta
- Roman Dam of Pego da Moura
- Roman decadence
- Roman dictator
- Roman dodecahedron
- Roman economy
- Roman Egypt
- Roman emergency decrees
- Roman emperor
- Roman Empire
- Roman–Etruscan Wars
- Roman expansion in Italy
- Roman Festival Liberalia
- Roman festivals
- Roman finance
- Roman folklore
- Roman fort, Mušov
- Roman Forum
- Roman Forum, Beirut
- Roman Forum (Mérida)
- Roman Forum (Thessaloniki)
- Roman forum of Philippopolis
- Roman funerary art
- Roman funerary practices
- Roman–Gallic wars
- Roman gardens
- Roman Gaul
- Roman glass
- Roman governor
- Roman graffiti
- Roman hairstyles
- Roman historiography
- Roman imperial cult
- Roman imperial period (chronology)
- Roman infantry tactics
- Roman influence in Caucasian Albania
- Roman invasion of Caledonia (208–210)
- Roman–Iranian relations
- Roman Italy
- Roman jewelry
- Roman jokes
- Roman Kingdom
- Roman–Latin wars
- Roman law
- Roman legion
- Roman litigation
- Roman magistrate
- Roman metallurgy
- Roman Milestones of Braga
- Roman military decorations and punishments
- Roman military diploma
- Roman military engineering
- Roman military frontiers and fortifications
- Roman military personal equipment
- Roman military tombstones
- Roman mosaic
- Roman mythology
- Roman naming conventions
- Roman navy
- Roman numerals
- Roman–Parthian War of 58–63
- Roman–Parthian War of 161–166
- Roman–Parthian Wars
- Roman people
- Roman–Persian Wars
- Roman pharaoh
- Roman portraiture
- Roman Procurator coinage
- Roman province
- Roman provincial currency
- Roman Provincial Forum (Mérida)
- Roman relations with Nubia
- Roman relations with the Armenians
- Roman Republic
- Roman Republican art
- Roman Republican currency
- Roman Republican governors of Gaul
- Roman road (Nord)
- Roman road from Silchester to Bath
- Roman road from Trier to Cologne
- Roman road in Cilicia
- Roman Road of Ankara
- Roman roads
- Roman roads in Africa
- Roman roads in Britannia
- Roman roads in Morocco
- Roman ruins of Casais Velhos
- Roman ruins of Cerro da Vila
- Roman ruins of Creiro
- Roman ruins of Milreu
- Roman ruins of Pisões
- Roman ruins of Quinta da Abicada
- Roman ruins of São Cucufate
- Roman ruins of Tróia
- Roman ruins of Villa Cardillio
- Roman–Sabine wars
- Roman salute
- Roman-Sardinian Wars
- Roman–Sasanian War of 421–422
- Roman sculpture
- Roman–Seleucid War
- Roman Senate
- Roman ship of Marausa
- Roman shipyard of Stifone (Narni)
- Roman siege engines
- Roman sites in Great Britain
- Roman square capitals
- Roman Syria
- Roman temple
- Roman temple of Alcántara
- Roman temple of Bziza
- Roman temple of Château-Bas
- Roman temple of Córdoba
- Roman Temple of Évora
- Roman temple of Vic
- Roman theatre (structure)
- Roman Theater (Amman)
- Roman Theatre, Aosta
- Roman Theatre, Benevento
- Roman Theatre (Bregenz)
- Roman Theatre (Cádiz)
- Roman Theatre (Cartagena)
- Roman Theatre (Mainz)
- Roman Theatre (Mérida)
- Roman Theatre, St Albans
- Roman Theatre (Tarraco)
- Roman theatre, Verona
- Roman Theater (Zaragoza)
- Roman Theatre at Apamea
- Roman Theatre at Bosra
- Roman Theatre at Palmyra
- Roman Theatre at Volterra
- Roman Theatre of Arles
- Roman Theatre of Catania
- Roman theatre of Dougga
- Roman Theatre of Florence
- Roman Theatre of Orange
- Roman theatre of Philippopolis
- Roman Thermae (Varna)
- Roman Thermae of Maximinus
- Roman timekeeping
- Roman Tomb (Silistra)
- Roman tribe
- Roman triumph
- Roman triumphal honours
- Roman tuba
- Roman usurper
- Roman villa
- Roman villa of Almoinhas
- Roman villa of Alto da Cidreira
- Roman villa of Ammaia
- Roman villa of Freiria
- Roman villa of Frielas
- Roman villa of Outeiro de Polima
- Roman villa of Quinta da Bolacha
- Roman villa of Rabaçal
- Roman villa of Santo André de Almoçageme
- Roman villa of Sendim
- Roman villa of Tourega
- Roman villa of Vale do Mouro
- Roman villa of Vilares
- Roman villas in northwestern Gaul
- Roman–Volscian wars
- Roman walls of Córdoba
- Roman walls of Lugo
- Roman war elephants
- Roman Warm Period
- Roman withdrawal from Africa (255 BC)
- Romanitas
- Romanization (cultural)
- Romanization of Anatolia
- Romanization of Hispania
- Romano-British culture
- Romano-Gallic Baths of Entrammes
- Romano-Germanic culture
- Romans in Persia
- Romans in sub-Saharan Africa
- Romulus
- Romulus and Remus
- Romulus Augustulus
- Rorarii
- Rosalia (festival)
- Rostra
- Rotulus
- Rubicon
- Rudchester Mithraeum
- Rudge Cup
- Ruina montium
- Rumina
- Rusellae
- Rustic capitals

== S ==
- S'Argamassa Roman Fish Farm
- Sabinian school
- Sacellum
- Sacerdos Bonae Deae
- Sacerdos Cereris
- Sacerdos Liberi
- Sack of Aquileia
- Sack of Bostra
- Sack of Rome (410)
- Sack of Rome (455)
- Sacra
- Sacramentum (oath)
- Sacred fire of Vesta
- Sacrosanctity
- Saeculum
- Saepta Julia
- Sagittarii
- Sagum
- Sagunto Roman theatre
- Saia Maior
- Saint-Martin-au-Val Sanctuary
- Salona
- Saloninus
- Salvius Tryphon
- Sambuca (siege engine)
- Samnite (gladiator type)
- Samnite Wars
- San Lázaro Roman aqueduct
- Sanctuary of the Three Gauls
- Sancus
- Sangarius Bridge
- Sanitation in ancient Rome
- Sarcina
- Sarcophagus of Lucius Cornelius Scipio Barbatus
- Sarcophagus of the Triumph of Bacchus (Lyon)
- Sardinia and Corsica
- Sarn Helen
- Saturn (mythology)
- Saturnalia
- Saturninus (magister militum)
- Savaria Mithraeum
- Saxon Shore
- Scaenae frons
- Scalabis
- Schaffhausen onyx
- Schola Castra Nova Equitum Singularium
- Scholae
- Scholae Palatinae
- Scior Carera
- Scipio Africanus
- Scipio Aemilianus
- Scipionic Circle
- Scissor (gladiator)
- Scorpio (weapon)
- Scotland during the Roman Empire
- Scriba (ancient Rome)
- Scrupulum
- Scutarius
- Scutum
- Scutum from Dura-Europos
- Scylletium
- Secespita
- Secessio plebis
- Second Battle of Cirta
- Second Battle of Clusium
- Second Battle of Tapae
- Second Catilinarian conspiracy
- Second Celtiberian War
- Second Dacian War
- Second Mithridatic War
- Second Punic War
- Second Servile War
- Second Triumvirate
- Secular Games
- Secutor
- Segedunum
- Segontium
- Segura Bridge
- Sejanus
- Şekerpınarı Bridge
- Sellisternium
- Sementivae
- Semis
- Semuncia
- Senate of the Roman Kingdom
- Senate of the Roman Empire
- Senate of the Roman Republic
- Senatorial province
- Senatus consultum
- Senatus consultum de Bacchanalibus
- Senatus consultum Macedonianum
- Senatus consultum ultimum
- Send under the yoke
- Seneca the Younger
- September (Roman month)
- Septemvir
- Septimania
- Septimius (usurper)
- Septimius Antiochus
- Septimius Severus
- Septimontium
- Septimus (praenomen)
- Septizodium
- Serapia
- Serbinum
- Sertorian War
- Servian constitution
- Servian Wall
- Servile Wars
- Sesquiplarius
- Sestertius
- Seven hills of Rome
- Severan art
- Severan Bridge
- Severan dynasty
- Severan dynasty family tree
- Severan Tondo
- Severus II
- Severus Alexander
- Sextans (coin)
- Sextian-Licinian Rogations
- Sextilis
- Sextus (praenomen)
- She-wolf (Roman mythology)
- Shrine of Venus Cloacina
- Si deus si dea
- Sica
- Sicilia (Roman province)
- Siege hook
- Siege of Alexandria (47 BC)
- Siege of Amida (359)
- Siege of Antioch (253)
- Siege of Aquileia
- Siege of Aracillum
- Siege of Arles (425)
- Siege of Aspis
- Siege of Asti (402)
- Siege of Augustodunum Haeduorum
- Siege of Autun (356)
- Siege of Brundisium
- Siege of Caesarea Cappadocia (260)
- Siege of Capua (211 BC)
- Siege of Carthage (Third Punic War)
- Siege of Corfinium
- Siege of Curicta
- Siege of Cyzicus
- Siege of Drepana
- Siege of Dura-Europos (256)
- Siege of Edessa (163)
- Siege of Edessa (165)
- Siege of Florence (405)
- Siege of Gush Halav
- Siege of Heraclea
- Siege of Hippo Regius
- Siege of Issa
- Siege of Jerusalem (37 BC)
- Siege of Jerusalem (63 BC)
- Siege of Jerusalem (70 CE)
- Siege of Lilybaeum (250–241 BC)
- Siege of Maiozamalcha
- Siege of Masada
- Siege of Massilia
- Siege of Massilia (413)
- Siege of Mytilene (81 BC)
- Siege of Nisibis (235)
- Siege of Nisibis (252)
- Siege of Nisibis (573)
- Siege of Numantia
- Siege of Oricum
- Siege of Philippopolis (250)
- Siege of Pirisabora
- Siege of Rhodes (88 BC)
- Siege of Rome (472)
- Siege of Saguntum
- Siege of Senonae
- Siege of Singara (360)
- Siege of Thala
- Siege of Thessalonica (254)
- Siege of Tyana (272)
- Siege of Utica (204 BC)
- Siege of Uxellodunum
- Siege of Yodfat
- Siege of Zama
- Siege of the Atuatuci
- Siege of the fortress at Muluccha
- Siege tower
- Sigillaria (ancient Rome)
- Signaculum
- Signifer
- Signiferi
- Silchester eagle
- Siliqua
- Silphium (antiquity)
- Silvanae
- Simpulum
- Sino-Roman relations
- Siparium
- Sirmium
- Sirmondian constitutions
- Site of the Claudian invasion of Britain
- Size of the Roman army
- Slavery in ancient Rome
- Slovakia in the Roman era
- Soccus
- Social class in ancient Rome
- Social War (91–87 BC)
- Socii
- Socii navales
- Sodales Augustales
- Sol (Roman mythology)
- Sol Invictus
- Solarium Augusti
- Solidus (coin)
- Soliferrum
- Sororium Tigillum
- Sortes
- Spartacus
- Spatha
- Specificatio (Roman law)
- Speculatores
- Spes
- Sphaeristerium
- Spiculum
- Spintria
- Spolia
- Spolia opima
- Spoon of Diocles
- SPQR
- Spur (architecture)
- Stabiae
- Stadiasmus Maris Magni
- Stadiasmus Patarensis
- Stadium of Domitian
- Staffordshire Moorlands Pan
- Stanegate
- State church of the Roman Empire
- Statilia gens
- Stationarius (Roman military)
- Statue of Mars, York
- Status in Roman legal system
- Stele of Vespasian
- Step (unit)
- Stibadium
- Stilicho's Pictish War
- Stipulatio
- Stoic Opposition
- Stola
- Storgosia
- Strata Diocletiana
- Strategy of the Roman military
- Strator
- Stridon
- Structural history of the Roman military
- Suasa
- Suasoria
- Sub-Roman Britain
- Subiaco Dams
- Subligaculum
- Substance abuse in ancient Rome
- Suburban Baths (Pompeii)
- Suburra
- Sudatorium
- Sudis (stake)
- Suebi
- Suebian knot
- Suetonius
- Suffragium
- Sulla
- Sulla's civil war
- Summa honoraria
- Summanus
- Summum bonum
- Suovetaurilia
- Superposed order
- Supplicatio
- Supplicia canum
- Surgery in ancient Rome
- Susegana Bridge
- Suspensura
- Switzerland in the Roman era
- Synthesis (clothing)
- Syria Palaestina

== T ==
- Taberna
- Tablinum
- Tabula ansata
- Tabula clesiana
- Tabula patronatus
- Tabularium
- Tacfarinas
- Tacitus
- Tacitus (emperor)
- Tanginus
- Tarentum (Campus Martius)
- Tarpeian Rock
- Tarquinia gens
- Tarquinian conspiracy
- Tarraco
- Tarragona Amphitheatre
- Taşgeçit Bridge
- Taşköprü (Adana)
- Taşköprü (Silifke)
- Taurian Games
- Taurobolic Altar (Lyon)
- Taurobolium
- Tautalus
- Teatro Berga
- Technological history of the Roman military
- Tempestas
- Temple of Antas
- Temple of Apollo (Melite)
- Temple of Apollo (Pompeii)
- Temple of Apollo (Side)
- Temple of Apollo Palatinus
- Temple of Apollo Sosianus
- Temple of Artemis, Jerash
- Temple of Asclepius, Rome
- Temple of Augustus, Barcelona
- Temple of Augustus, Pula
- Temple of Augustus and Livia
- Temple of Augustus and Rome
- Temple of Bacchus
- Temple of Bel
- Temple of Bel, Dura-Europos
- Temple of Bellona, Ostia
- Temple of Bellona, Rome
- Temple of Caesar
- Temple of Castor and Pollux
- Temple of Claudius
- Temple of Claudius, Colchester
- Temple of Concord
- Temple of Cybele (Palatine)
- Temple of Diana (Nîmes)
- Temple of Diana (Rome)
- Temple of Divus Augustus
- Temple of Divus Augustus, Nola
- Temple of Faunus
- Temple of Fides
- Temple of Flora
- Temple of Fortuna Equestris
- Temple of Fortuna Muliebris
- Temple of Fortuna Primigenia
- Temple of Fortuna Respiciens
- Temple of Garni
- Temple of Hadrian
- Temple of Hercules (Amman)
- Temple of Hercules Custos
- Temple of Hercules Musarum
- Temple of Hercules Pompeianus
- Temple of Hercules Victor
- Temple of Honor and Virtue
- Temple of Isis (Pompeii)
- Temple of Isis and Serapis
- Temple of Janus (Forum Holitorium)
- Temple of Janus (Roman Forum)
- Temple of Juno Caelestis (Dougga)
- Temple of Juno Lucina
- Temple of Juno Moneta
- Temple of Juno Regina
- Temple of Juno Regina (Aventine)
- Temple of Juno Sospita (Palatine)
- Temple of Jupiter, Damascus
- Temple of Jupiter (Pompeii)
- Temple of Jupiter (Roman Heliopolis)
- Temple of Jupiter (Silifke)
- Temple of Jupiter, Split
- Temple of Jupiter Anxur
- Temple of Jupiter Apenninus
- Temple of Jupiter Custos
- Temple of Jupiter Feretrius
- Temple of Jupiter Optimus Maximus
- Temple of Jupiter Stator (2nd century BC)
- Temple of Jupiter Stator (3rd century BC)
- Temple of Jupiter Victor
- Temple of Luna
- Temple of Marcus Aurelius
- Temple of Mars
- Temple of Mars in Clivo
- Temple of Mars Ultor
- Temple of Matidia
- Temple of Mercury
- Temple of Mercury (Puy de Dôme)
- Temple of Minerva, Assisi
- Temple of Minerva (Aventine)
- Temple of Minerva (Forum of Nerva)
- Temple of Minerva Chalcidica
- Temple of Minerva Medica
- Temple of Minerva Medica (nymphaeum)
- Temple of Neptune (Rome)
- Temple of Ops
- Temple of Peace, Rome
- Temple of Piety
- Temple of Portunus
- Temple of Proserpina
- Temple of Pudicitia Patricia
- Temple of Pudicitia Plebeia
- Temple of Quirinus
- Temple of Salus
- Temple of Saturn
- Temple of Serapis (Quirinal Hill)
- Temple of Spes (Carmental)
- Temple of Spes (Quirinal)
- Temple of Tellus
- Temple of Trajan
- Temple of Veiovis
- Temple of Venus and Roma
- Temple of Venus Erycina (Capitoline Hill)
- Temple of Venus Erycina (Quirinal Hill)
- Temple of Venus Genetrix
- Temple of Vespasian and Titus
- Temple of Vesta
- Temple of Vesta, Tivoli
- Temple of Victory
- Temple of Vulcan
- Temple of Zeus Hypsistos
- Temple of the gens Flavia
- Temple of the Nymphs
- Temple of the Sun (Rome)
- Temples of Cybele in Rome
- Temples of Mount Hermon
- Temples of the Beqaa Valley
- Tepidarium
- Terebinth of Nero
- Terme della Rotonda (Catania)
- Terme Taurine
- Terminalia (festival)
- Terminus (god)
- Terra sigillata
- Tessera (commerce)
- Tesserarius
- Testudo formation
- Tetrapylon
- Tetrarchy
- Tetricus I
- Tetricus II
- The Garden of the Fugitives
- The Seven Halls
- Theatre Area of Pompeii
- Theatre of ancient Rome
- Theatre of Balbus
- Theatre of Clunia Sulpicia
- Theatre of Marcellus
- Theatre of Pompey
- Theodosian dynasty
- Theodosius I
- Thermae
- Thermes de Cluny
- Thermopolium
- Third Mithridatic War
- Third Punic War
- Third Servile War
- Tholos (architecture)
- Tholos (Ancient Rome)
- Thracia
- Thracian kingdom (Roman vassal state)
- Thraco-Roman
- Thraex
- Tiberinalia
- Tiberinus (god)
- Tiberius
- Tiberius (praenomen)
- Tiberius Claudius Nero (father of Tiberius Caesar)
- Tiberius Claudius Verus
- Tiberius Gemellus
- Ticinum
- Tigias
- Tilurium
- Tingi
- Tintinnabulum (ancient Rome)
- Tirones
- Titii
- Titulus pictus
- Titus
- Titus (praenomen)
- Titus Labienus
- Titus Pomponius Atticus
- Titus Tatius
- Toga
- Togatus Barberini
- Tollere liberum
- Tomb of Caecilia Metella
- Tomb of Eurysaces the Baker
- Tomb of Hilarus Fuscus
- Tomb of Priscilla
- Tomb of Publius Vibius Marianus
- Tomb of the Julii
- Tomb of the Scipios
- Tombs of Via Latina
- Topography of ancient Rome
- Tourism in ancient Rome
- Tours Amphitheatre
- Tower of Vesunna
- Townley Antinous
- Townley Hadrian
- Tracta (dough)
- Traianus (magister peditum)
- Traiectum (Utrecht)
- Trajan
- Trajan's Bridge
- Trajan's Column
- Trajan's Dacian Wars
- Trajan's Forum
- Trajan's Market
- Trajan's Parthian campaign
- Trajan's Wall
- Trajanic art
- Transvectio equitum
- Tre Taverne
- Treaties between Rome and Carthage
- Treaty of Lutatius
- Treaty of Rhandeia
- Trebonianus Gallus
- Tremissis
- Trennfurt Roman Fort
- Tres Alpes
- Tres militiae
- Tresviri capitales
- Trial of Trebonius
- Triarii
- Tribal Assembly
- Tribune
- Tribune of the plebs
- Tribunus angusticlavius
- Tribunus laticlavius
- Tributum
- Tributum capitis
- Triclinium
- Triens
- Trier Amphitheater
- Trier Imperial Baths
- Trigarium
- Trigon (game)
- Trimontium (Newstead)
- Tripontium
- Tristia
- Triumphal Arch of Orange
- Triumvir monetalis
- Triumvirate
- Tropaeum Alpium
- Tryphé
- Tubilustrium
- Tunic
- Tunica interior
- Tunica molesta
- Tunnels of Claudius
- Turicum
- Turma
- Turpilio
- Turret (Hadrian's Wall)
- Turris Mamilia
- Tusculum
- Tusculum portrait
- Tutela
- Twelve Tables
- Tympanum (hand drum)
- Tyre Hippodrome

== U ==
- Ulpia Traiana Sarmizegetusa
- Ulpian Library
- Ulpiana
- Umbilicus urbis Romae
- Uncia (coin)
- Uncia (unit)
- Unguentarium
- Upper Germanic-Rhaetian Limes
- Urbanus (usurper)
- Ustrinum
- Usucapio
- Uthina
- Uti possidetis

== V ==
- Vadomarius
- Vae victis
- Vaison Diadumenos
- Valens
- Valentia (Roman Britain)
- Valentinian I
- Valentinian II
- Valentinian III
- Valentinianic dynasty
- Valentinianus Galates
- Valerian (emperor)
- Valerian II
- Valerian and Porcian laws
- Valerio-Horatian laws
- Valerius Valens
- Vallum
- Vallum (Hadrian's Wall)
- Vatican Necropolis
- Velarium
- Velian Hill
- Velificatio
- Velites
- Velletri Sarcophagus
- Venatio
- Veneralia
- Venereum
- Venetia et Histria
- Veni, vidi, vici
- Venta Belgarum
- Venta Icenorum
- Venta Silurum
- Venus (mythology)
- Venus Throw
- Venutius
- Verona Arena
- Vertumnus
- Verulamium
- Verutum
- Vervactor
- Vespasian
- Vespasianus Titus Tunnel
- Vesta (mythology)
- Vestal Virgin
- Vestalia
- Vestibule, Split
- Vestiges of the Gallo-Roman wall, Grenoble
- Veterinarius
- Vetranio
- Vexillarius
- Vexillatio
- Vexillum
- Via Aemilia
- Via Aemilia Scauri
- Via Agrippa
- Via Amerina
- Via Annia
- Via Appia
- Via Aquitania
- Via Ardeatina
- Via Argentaria
- Via Asinaria
- Via Asturica Burdigalam
- Via Augusta
- Via Aurelia
- Via Caecilia
- Via Campana
- Via Cassia
- Via Claudia Augusta
- Via Claudia Nova
- Via Clodia
- Via Cornelia
- Via Devana
- Via Domitia
- Via Domiziana
- Via Egnatia
- Via Flaminia
- Via Flavia
- Via Gallica
- Via Gemina
- Via Hadriana
- Via Julia Augusta
- Via Labicana
- Via Labicana Augustus
- Via Lata
- Via Latina
- Via Laurentina
- Via Maris
- Via Militaris
- Via Nomentana
- Via Ostiensis
- Via Pontica
- Via Popilia
- Via Portuensis
- Via Postumia
- Via Praenestina
- Via Regina
- Via Sacra
- Via Salaria
- Via Severiana
- Via Sublacensis
- Via Tiburtina
- Via Traiana
- Via Traiana Nova
- Via Trionfale
- Via Valeria
- Via XVIII
- Vicarello Cups
- Vicarius
- Vicesima hereditatium
- Victor (emperor)
- Victoria (mythology)
- Victoriatus
- Victorinus
- Victorinus Junior
- Victory column
- Victory title
- Vicus
- Vicus Jugarius
- Vicus Longus
- Vicus Patricius
- Vicus Tuscus
- Viennensis
- Vigiles
- Vigintisexviri
- Vilicus
- Villa Armira
- Villa Boscoreale
- Villa dei Sette Bassi
- Villa dei Volusii
- Villa delle Vignacce
- Villa Gordiani
- Villa Jovis
- Villa of Diomedes
- Villa of Domitian
- Villa of Livia
- Villa of Torre de Palma
- Villa of the Mysteries
- Villa of the Papyri
- Villa of the Quintilii
- Villa Poppaea
- Villa publica
- Villa Romana del Casale
- Villa Romana del Tellaro
- Villa Romana di Patti
- Villa rustica
- Viminacium
- Viminal Hill
- Vinalia
- Vindobala
- Vindobona
- Vindolanda
- Vindolanda tablets
- Vindonissa
- Vine staff
- Vino Greco
- Vinovia
- Vir illustris
- Vir militaris
- Virgil
- Viriathus
- Viroconium Cornoviorum
- Virtus
- Virtus (deity)
- Virunum
- Vitalii
- Vitellius
- Vitruvian opening
- Vitruvius
- Vitudurum
- Vitulatio
- Vivarium (Rome)
- Voli
- Volturnalia
- Volturnus
- Volubilis
- Volusianus
- Volute
- Vomitorium
- Vorenus and Pullo
- Votive column
- Vulcan (mythology)
- Vulcanal

== W ==
- Waldgirmes Forum
- Wales in the Roman era
- Wall of Severus
- Walls of Constantinople
- Walls of Seville
- War of Actium
- Wars of Augustus
- Weddings in ancient Rome
- Welwyn Roman Baths
- Western Roman Empire
- Wetterau Limes
- White Bridge (Mysia)
- Witcham Gravel helmet
- Women in ancient Rome
- Writings of Cicero
- Wymondley Roman Villa

== X ==
- Xenia motif
- Xylospongium

== Y ==
- Year of the Five Emperors
- Year of the Four Emperors
- Year of the Six Emperors
- York city walls
- Youth of Magdalensberg

== Z ==
- Zaghouan Aqueduct
- Zeno (emperor)
- Zliten mosaic
- Zuccabar

== Lists ==
- Ancient monuments in Rome
- Ancient Roman fasti
- Ancient Roman temples
- Ancient Romans
- Aqueducts in the city of Rome
- Aqueducts in the Roman Empire
- Censors of the Roman Republic
- Cities founded by the Romans
- Civil wars and revolts
- Condemned Roman emperors
- Governors of Roman Britain
- Late Roman provinces
- Monuments of the Roman Forum
- Pontifices maximi
- Roman amphitheatres
- Roman aqueducts by date
- Roman army unit types
- Roman auxiliary regiments
- Roman basilicas
- Roman bridges
- Roman canals
- Roman cisterns
- Roman consuls
- Roman consuls designate
- Roman dams and reservoirs
- Roman deities
- Roman dictators
- Roman dynasties
- Roman domes
- Roman emperors
- Roman generals
- Roman gentes
- Roman imperial victory titles
- Roman laws
- Roman legions
- Roman moneyers during the Republic
- Roman praetors
- Roman public baths
- Roman quaestors
- Roman taxes
- Roman theatres
- Roman tribunes
- Roman triumphal arches
- Undated Roman consuls
- Roman usurpers
- Roman wars and battles
- Thirty Tyrants

== See also ==
- Outline of ancient Rome
- Timeline of ancient Rome
