= Porta Romana =

Porta Romana (literally "Roman Gate") may refer to:

- Porta Romana (Milan)
- Porta Romana (Milan Metro)
- Porta Gemina in Ascoli Piceno, also known as Porta Romana
- Porta Romana (Florence) in Florence
