= Lex Quisquis =

The Lex Quisquis was issued by the Roman emperors Arcadius and Honorius in 397 as an expansion of the Roman law of treason. Up to this time, treason had been defined as any action against the Roman state by the Julian law on treason. The lex Quisquis added the murder of counsellors to the list of crimes, which in medieval society evolved into the idea that assaulting a royal officer was a treasonable act.

== Sources ==
- R.A. Baumann, "Some Problems of the Lex Quisquis", Antichthon 1 (1967) 49-59.
- Lothar Kolmer, "Christus als beleidigte Majestät. Von der Lex 'Quisquis' (397) bis zur Dekretale 'Vergentis'" (1199)", in Hubert Mordek (ed.). Papsttum, Kirche und Recht im Mittelalter: Festschrift für Horst Fuhrmann zum 65. Geburtstag, pp. 1–13. Tübingen: M. Niemeyer, 1991.
