= Calligraphus =

Ancient copyist

A calligraphus (pl. calligraphi) was an ancient copyist or scrivener, who transcribed correctly and in its entirety what the notaries had taken down in notes, or minutes—duties similar to the modern work of engrossing.

The minutes of acts were always taken down in a kind of cipher, or shorthand, so that the Notaries, as the Romans called them, or the Σημειόγραφοι and Ταχύγραφοι, as the Greeks called them, could keep pace with a speaker or person who dictated. These notes being understood by few, were copied exactly by people with good handwriting; these were called calligraphi, a name often found in ancient writings.
