= Roman Road of Ankara =

Coordinates: 39°56′32.23″N 32°51′21.47″E

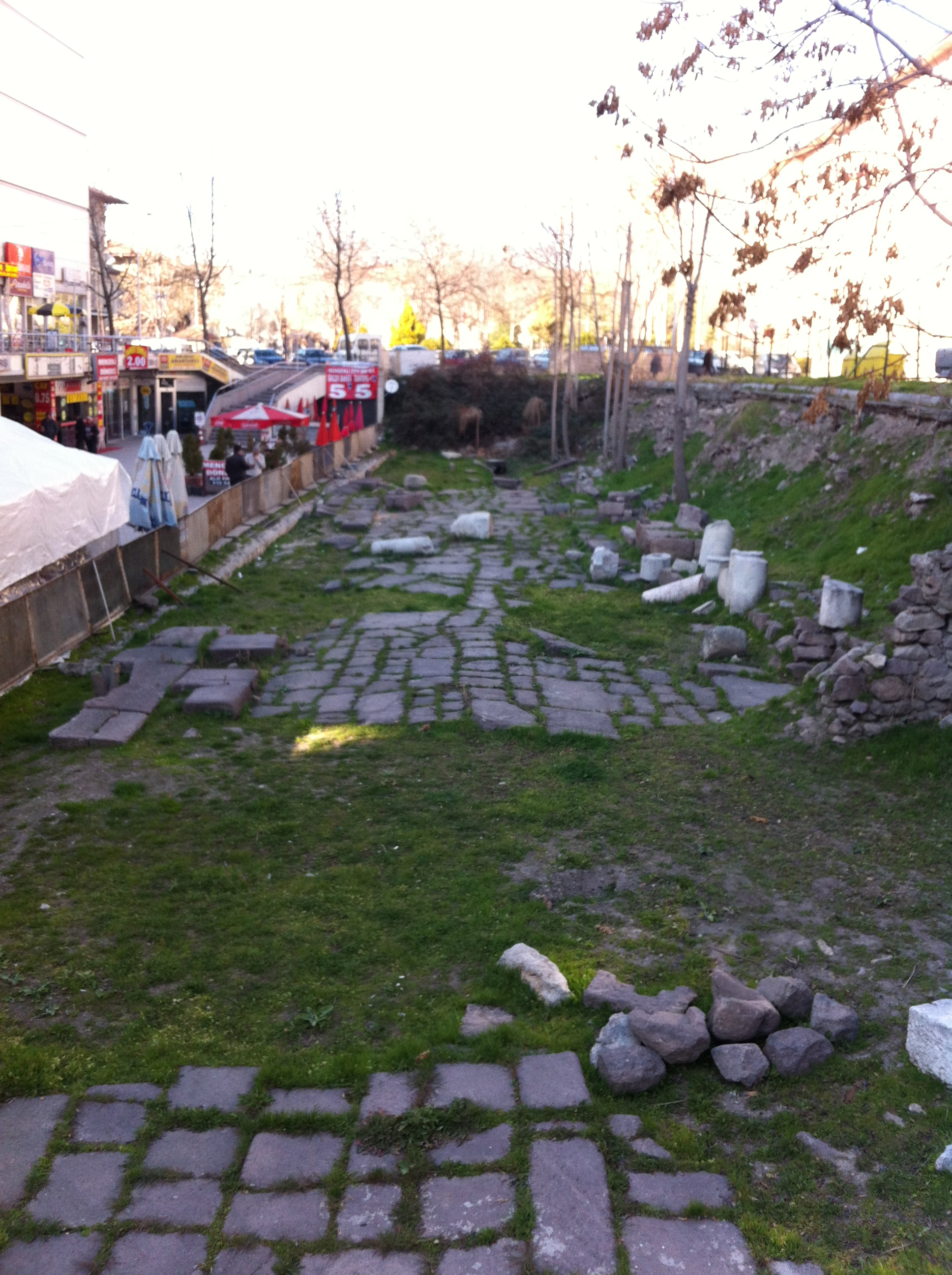
A section of the road

The Roman Road of Ankara or Cardo Maximus is an ancient Roman road in Ankara, the capital of Turkey. The road was found in 1995 by Turkish archaeologist Cevdet Bayburtluoğlu. It is 216 metres (709 ft) long and 6.7 metres (22 ft) wide. Many ancient artifacts were discovered during the excavations along the road and most of them are currently displayed at the Museum of Anatolian Civilizations.

== See also ==
- Roman roads
