= Nascio =

In Roman mythology, Nascio or Natio was one of many goddesses of birth, and a protector of women in labor. According to Cicero in De Natura Deorum (On the Nature of the Gods), she was worshipped particularly in the territory of Ardea. This goddess is considered to be the Roman counterpart of Eileithyia, the Greek goddess of childbirth.

== See also ==
- List of Roman birth and childhood deities
- Di nixi
