= Lex Gellia Cornelia =

Ancient Roman law

Lex Gellia Cornelia was a law passed in 72 BC after a proposal of the consuls Lucius Gellius Poplicola and Gnaeus Cornelius Lentulus Clodianus, that gave Pompey the power of granting citizenship to valuable soldiers. This law is known only through Cicero's speech Pro Balbo (56 BC), since Lucius Cornelius Balbus had been given the citizenship by Pompey but he was then under trial for the removal of the citizenship. Here are the passage in which Cicero mentions the law:

Nascitur, iudices, causa Corneli ex ea lege, quam L. Gellius Cn. Cornelius ex senatus sententia tulerunt; qua lege videmus ita esse sanctum, ut cives Romani sint ii, quos Cn. Pompeius de consilii sententia singillatim civitate donaverit.

"What has given rise to the case of Cornelius, gentlemen, is a law which Lucius Gellius and Gnaeus Cornelius carried, in accordance with a resolution of the Senate; and we see that by this law it was enacted that those on whom Gnaeus Pompeius, with the concurrence of his advisers, conferred Roman citizenship individually, should be Roman citizens."

(Cic. Balb. 19)

This law allowed Pompey to give the citizenship with a few conditions:

- singulatim: he could give it by name to a person or more;
- de consilii sententia: the grant had to be approved by a group of Roman citizens that was appointed in this role, they could be soldiers or senators, based on circumstance;
- fundus fieri: the person that was granted citizenship had to be part of a community that had already assumed the statute of fundus fieri, a statute that is yet to be clarified.

== Bibliography ==
- Pani Mario e Todisco Elisabetta, Società e istituzioni di Roma antica, Carocci, Roma, 2009
- Pani Mario e Todisco Elisabetta, Storia romana dalle origini alla tarda antichità, Carocci, Roma, 2008
- Rotondi Giovanni, Leges Publicae populi Romani, Olms, Hildesheim, 1962
