= Capitoline Base =

Statue base dedicated to Hadrian in 136

The Capitoline Base or Vicomagistri Base is a marble statue base dedicated to Hadrian in 136 by the 'vicomagistri' or masters of the shrines and temples of Rome. It is vital in reconstructing the topography of ancient Rome, since it lists the vicomagistri shrine by shrine. It was found on the Capitoline Hill in the 15th century and is now held in the Capitoline Museums.
