= Reparator =

- Minor god of Fields; God of preparing the land for crops

In Roman mythology, Reparator (or Rederator) was the deity of the preparing fallow land for crops. He was one of the twelve helper gods of Ceres. His name was invoked during the Cerealia, along with the other eleven helper gods of Ceres.
