= Archimime =

Funeral custom jester

An archimime is a chief mime or jester. Among the ancient Romans, archimimes were performers who imitated the manners, gestures, and speech both of the living and the dead. At first, they were only employed in the theatre, but were afterwards admitted to their feasts, and at last to funerals. At funerals, archimimes walked behind the corpse, imitating the gestures and behaviors of the person being carried to the funeral pyre, as if they were still alive.
