= Piazzale delle Corporazioni =

Forum at Ostia
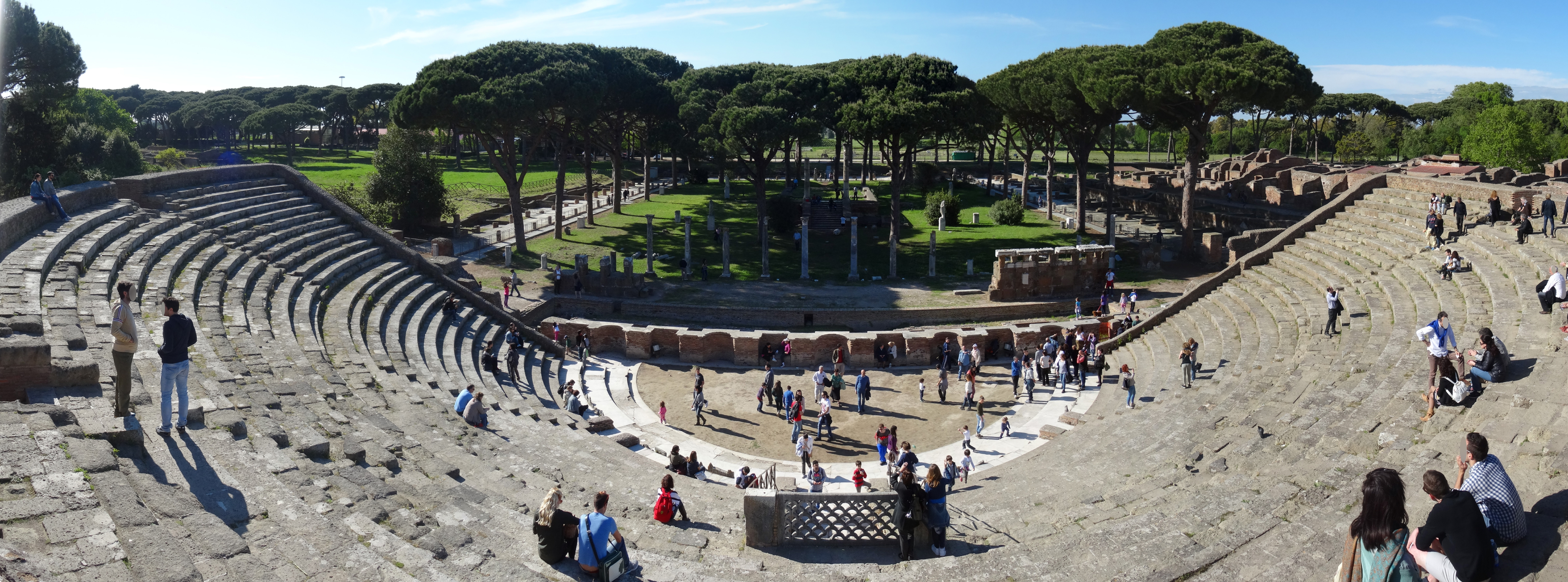
- View of the Piazzale delle Corporazioni from the Theatre
- Click on the map to see marker.
- 41°45′23″N 12°17′28″E
- Location: Ostia, Lazio

Site notes
- Website: www.ostiaantica.beniculturali.it

The Forum of Corporations, or the Piazzale delle Corporazioni, was the principal center of commerce and trade for the Roman Empire mainly during the Age of Augustus. Located in the major port city of Ostia, this open-air market was essential for Rome as a place of varying and exotic goods from foreign lands. Merchants gathered here to sell anything from grain and shipping services to elephants and giraffes.

Rebuilt in the 2nd century AD, the Forum of Corporations was also representative of the many diverse cultures that made up the Roman Empire. Oil importers, grain importers, rope-makers, and ship builders from corporations spanning across the empire came here to benefit from Ostia’s positioning at the mouth of the Tiber River, which easily facilitated the importation and transportation of goods into the empire.

== Structure ==
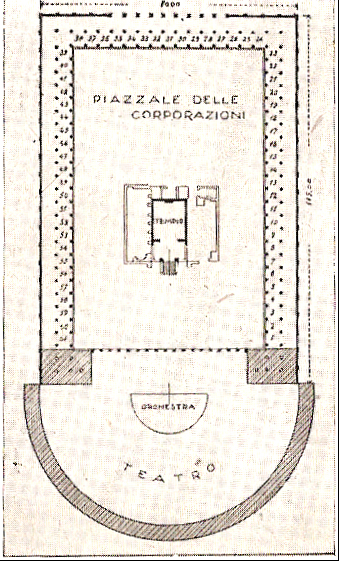
Plan of the Piazzale delle Corporazioni

A stuccoed brick wall enclosed the Forum; it measured 100 meters by 80 meters. A total of 61 rooms, each which measured 4 meters by 4 meters, opened onto the marketplace. The rooms were separated by a wooden partition and were arranged according to the geographic origin of the merchant or business, the majority which were based in Africa.

There was also a temple in the middle of the forum sacred either to Annona Augusta, the Divinity of Imperial Supplies, or Ceres Augusta. This temple served as a guild temple.

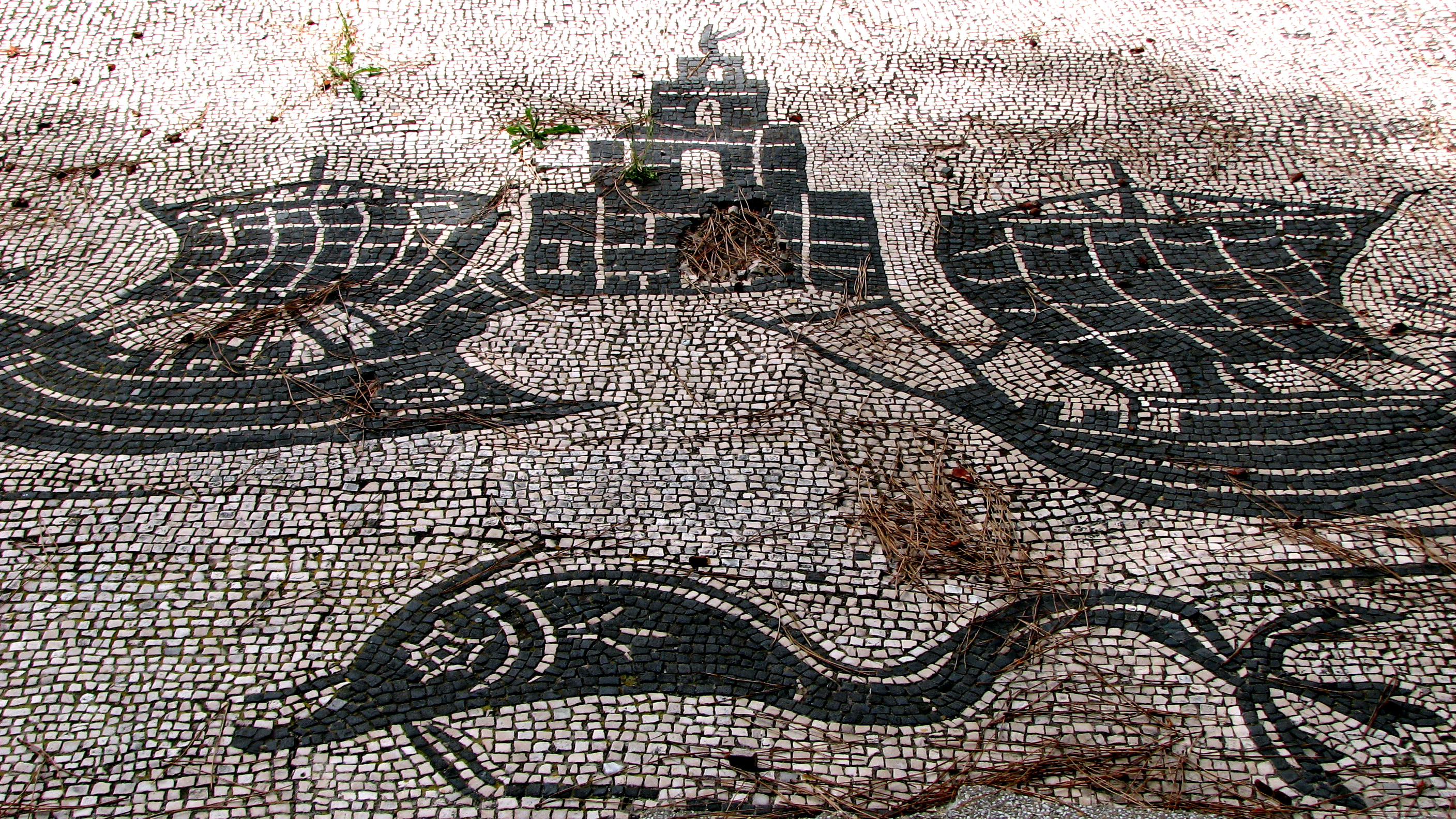
An example of the mosaics found in the Forum of Corporations

The most notable detail of the Forum of Corporations is the intricate black and white mosaics that lie in front of each shop. These mosaics indicated the professional associations of each vendor as well as inspired a sense of nostalgia for the distant homes of each of the merchants. The Forum was adjacent to the Theatre of Ostia and people would also pass through the Forum before and after performances.

== Center for Guilds ==
The Piazzale delle Corporazioni was often the home of the offices for approximately 40 guilds. These guilds were religious associations that dealt mainly with grain trade and navigation through Ostia, which served as the main food supply source for Rome. There were six divisions of guilds: Grain Shipping and Related Services, Commerce, Transport, Trades, Civil Service, Cults (Hermansen). The guilds represented a bridge between international and domestic relations through trading, worship and banquets.

Many guilds used the temple in the centre of the Forum of Corporations as a meeting place where they would worship, and hold banquets and assemblies. The various perennial religious ceremonies that they celebrated were performed at the temple.
