= Ludi Piscatorii =

The Ludi Piscatorii was a Roman holiday celebrated on 7 June in the 3rd century BC in honor of Father Tiber. The holiday was celebrated by the fishermen of Rome; the celebration was directed by the Praetor. All fish that were caught on this day were sacrificed by fire at the Temple of Vulcan
