= Vir militaris =

The vir militaris (plural: viri militares) was a Roman legate (or general) who governed a consular military province of the Roman Empire. Tacitus mentioned the phrase vir militaris in some of his passages in order to describe ordinary soldiers or junior officers. Overall, the name was given to anyone who was experienced in military life or was given an opportunity to establish a reputation through warfare. According to Brian Campbell, the viri militares did not represent a homogeneous unit with special characteristics.

== Sources ==
- Campbell, Brian. "Who Were the Viri Militares?" The Journal of Roman Studies. Vol. 65, pp. 11–31, 1975.
