= Imporcitor =

Roman god of the third ploughing

- Minor god of Fields; God of ploughing land with a wide furrow

In Roman mythology Imporcitor was the deity of ploughing land with a wide furrow. He was one of the twelve helper gods of Ceres. He is also labeled as the maker of pigs. His name was invoked during the Cerealia, along with the other eleven helper gods of Ceres.
