= Hannibal's Bridge =

Roman bridge in Rapallo, Italy

Coordinates: 44.3469°N 9.2271°E

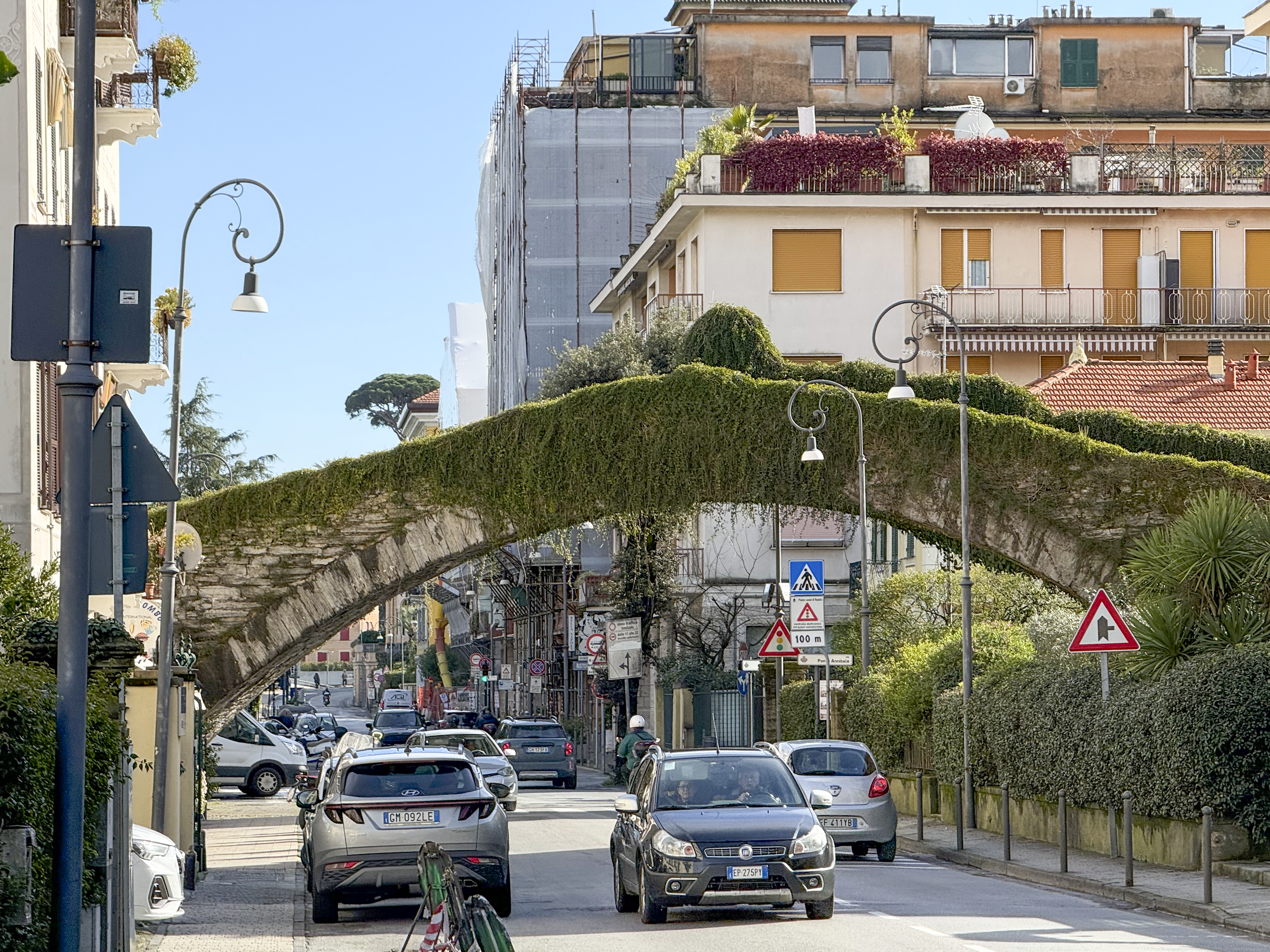
Modern view of Hannibal's Bridge in Rapallo, Italy

Hannibal's Bridge (Italian: Ponte Annibale) at Rapallo, Italy is one of the oldest structures in the city. This bridge was possibly used by Carthaginian commander Hannibal during his campaign against Rome in the Second Punic War, where he unloaded supplies on the Tigullia coast (region from Portofino to Anzo di Framura). The bridge could also be connected to the Battle of Trebbia (218 BC).

The structure's name first appears in a notary deed dated 7 April 1049, where it is claimed that "Rainaldo donated some land near the bridge to the Genovese Church of Santa Maria di Castello".

The bridge was renovated in 1733 after widespread flooding. Ninety years later, after the Kingdom of Sardinia had annexed all of Liguria, the final section of the creek that the bridge spanned was diverted to construct a new road to Santa Margherita. Today, the overgrown bridge is closed off to the public but is visibly located in downtown Rapallo, crossing over the Corso Cristoforo Colombo thoroughfare to Santa Margherita.

== Bibliography ==
1. Regione Liguria - http://www.TerrediPortifino.eu%5B%5D

2. "Empires Ascendant" Timeframe 400BC to 200AD. Time-Life Series. United States ISBN 9780809464005. Librarything.com
