= Hastiliarius =

Military training officer of the Roman army

A hastiliarius was a weapons instructor in the Roman Empire. They trained raw troops with standard weapons and fighting techniques.

== Meaning and root ==
"Hastiliarius" comes from hastati, which refer to raw troops in the Roman army. These raw troops often made up the front line of a Roman battle line, using originally spears then swords as their primary weapons. The name hastati comes from the Latin hasta, meaning spear. This suggests that the hastiliarius commonly trained soldiers to use spears and swords.

== Duties ==
A hastiliarius prepared the inexperienced, "green" hastati for battle. Hastati would often be put in the front to avoid losing experienced soldiers and prevent them from running from the battle. The hastiliarius would prepare these new soldiers to prove their skill on the battlefield and become a basic soldier in the Roman Army.
