= Temple of Divus Augustus, Nola =

Temple of Divus Augustus
- Interactive map of Temple of Divus Augustus
- Location: Nola, Campania, Italy
- Coordinates: 40.924877°N 14.523594°E
- Type: Roman temple
- Beginning date: circa 14 AD
- Completion date: 26 AD
- Dedicated to: Augustus

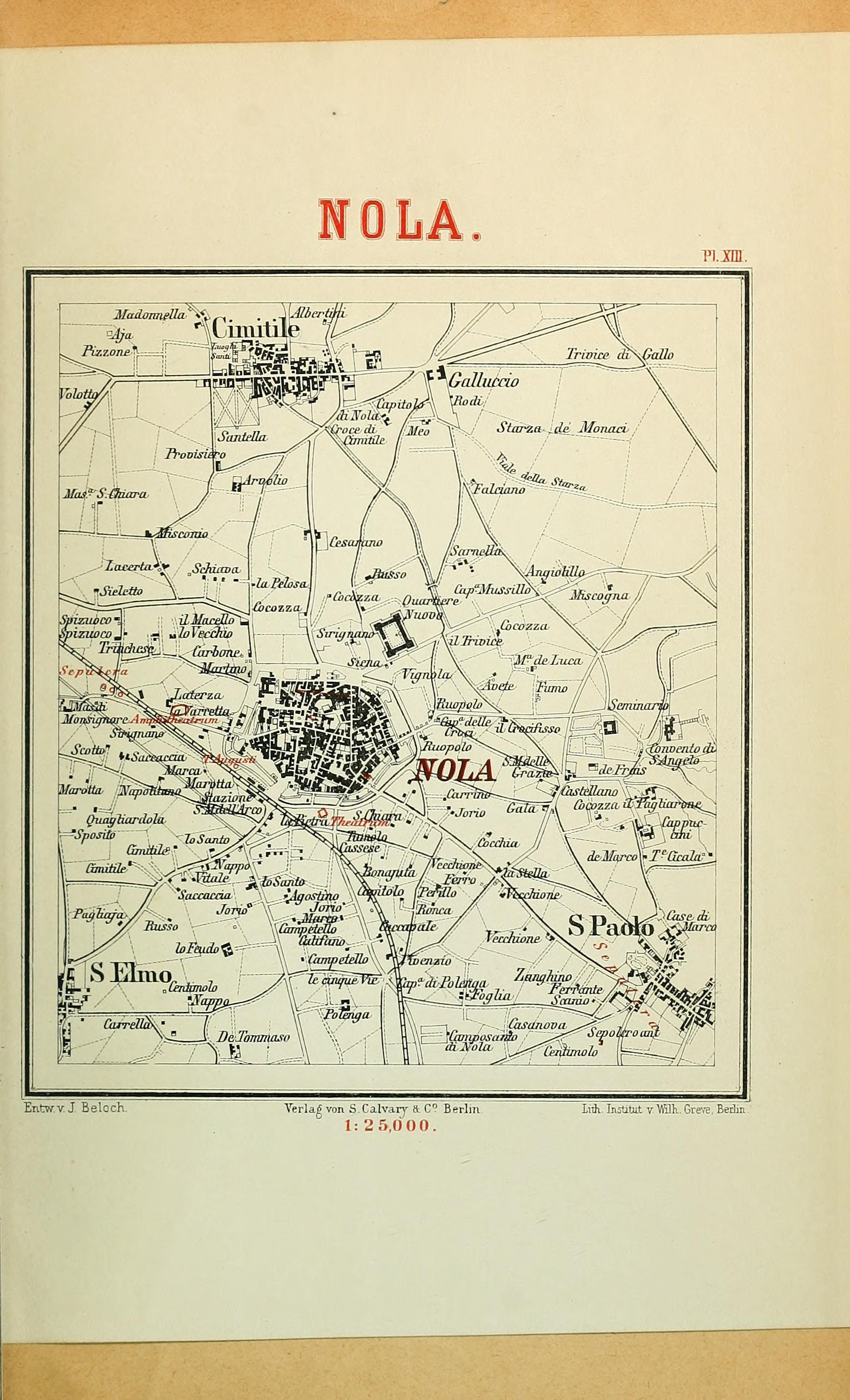
A map of the ancient city of Nola with the location of the temple in red.

The Temple of Divus Augustus was a temple commemorating the first deified Roman emperor, Augustus. It was constructed in Nola in Campania, where Augustus had died in AD 14. The temple was erected on the place where Augustus died and was dedicated by his successor Tiberius in 26.
