= Abalienatio =

Concept in Roman law

Abalienatio, in Roman law, is a legal transfer of property by sale or other alienation. According to Cicero, abalienatio est ejus rei, quae mancipi est, aut traditio alteri nexu aut in jure cessio, inter quos ea jure civili fieri possunt. Cicero defines abalienatio to be ejus rei quae mancipi est; and this is effected either by traditio alteri nexu aut in jure cessio inter quos ea jure civili fieri possunt. According to this definition, abalienatio is of a res mancipi, a class of things determinate; and the mode of transfer is either by traditio nexu or by in jure cessio.
