= Battle of Bovillae =

Political fight in 52 BC

The Battle of Bovillae was a term that Cicero used to describe a fight between the gangs of Clodius and Milo on January 18, 52 BC. The two were bitter political rivals—Clodius was a candidate for the praetorship and Milo the consulship. They met by accident on the road near Bovillae, both being accompanied by armed supporters. In the fighting that ensued, Clodius was killed, setting off a storm of violence in Rome.
