= Leuconium (Pannonia) =

Town in the south of Pannonia

Coordinates: 45°11′24″N 18°17′35″E

Leuconium or Leucono was a town in the south of Pannonia, placed by the Antonine Itinerary on the road from Aemona to Sirmium, 82 Roman miles to the northwest of the latter town.

Its site is tentatively located near modern Donji Andrijevci, Croatia.
