= Mercuralia =

Roman Festival of Mercury

Mercuralia was a Roman celebration known also as the "Festival of Mercury". Mercury (Greek counterpart: Hermes) was the god of merchants and commerce, among other things. On May 15 merchants would sprinkle their heads, their ships and merchandise, and their businesses with water taken from the well at Porta Capena.
