= Vitruvian opening =

Window or frame that widens from top to bottom

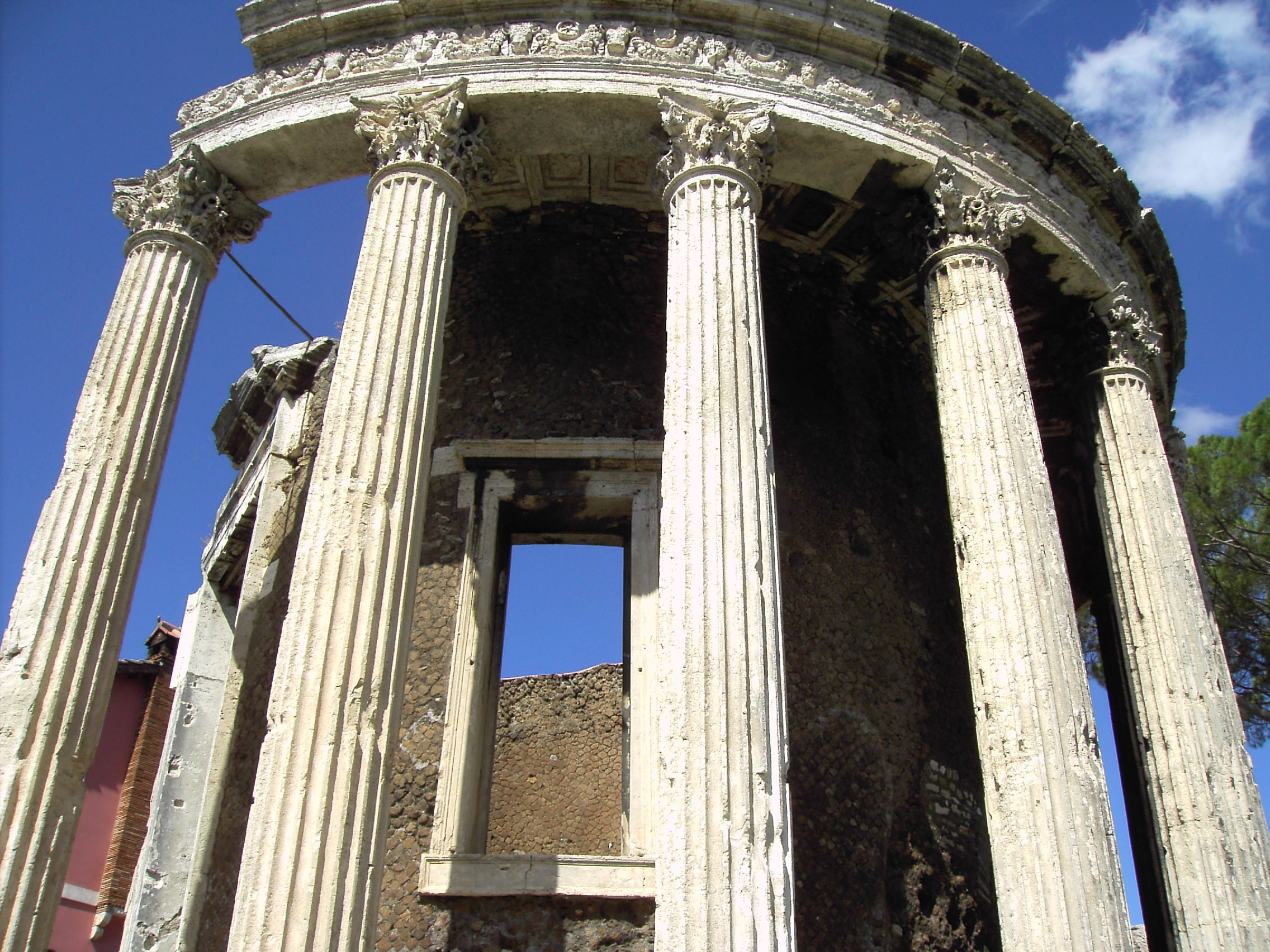
The prototypical Vitruvian opening at the Temple of Vesta

A Vitruvian opening is a window or frame that is slightly larger at the bottom than the top.

The term was first described by Vitruvius and mentioned by Andrea Palladio, referring to a window at the Temple of Vesta at Tivoli. The term Tivoli window is also used.
