= Bagnaccio =

Bagnaccio is the name of ancient thermal baths 8 km (5.0 mi) northwest of Viterbo, in the Lazio region of Italy. They are still in use. Viterbo is also known as La città termale ("The Thermal City") because of the many hot springs that dot the nearby countryside.

The baths are located directly on the ancient Via Cassia on the road to Montefiascone. The modern Via Cassia runs about 1,000 m (3,300 ft) east of the baths. The site is still noted for the ancient Roman ruins of Bacucco, a small baths complex on the narrow, unpaved strada bianca ("white road").

The baths were recorded in drawings by Michelangelo (Lille). Regular bathers at Bagnaccio pay €12 to €18 for the baths' upkeep, but day passes are also available.
