= Compulsor =

In Ancient Roman law enforcement, a compulsor was an officer under the Roman emperors, dispatched from court into the provinces, to force the payment of taxes, etc., which had not been paid within the time prescribed.

The procedure is briefly summarized in Codex Theodosianus i.14.1, "omnia tributa exigere suscipere postremo conpellere iubemus." Egyptian documents also afford a good deal of illustration, as explained in Matthias Gelzer's Studien zur byzantinischen Verwaltung Ägyptens, 42 sqq.

These were charged with so many exactions, under color of their office, that Honorius dismissed them by law in 412.

The laws of the Visigoths mention military compulsors; which were officers among the Goths, whose business was to oblige the tardy soldiers to go into the fight, to run an attack, etc.

Cassian mentions a kind of monastic compulsors, whose business was to declare the hours of canonical office, and to make sure the monks went to church at those hours.

The word is Latin, formed of the verb compellere, "to oblige; constrain".
