= Lex Antonia de Termessibus =

The Lex Antonia de Termessibus was a Roman law passed in 71 or 68 BC, at the initiative of the tribune Gaius Antonius.

The purpose of the law was to form an alliance between the city of Termessus and Rome.

== See also ==
- Lex Antonia
