= Battle of Canusium (89 BC) =

The Battle of Canusium was an engagement during the Social War. A Roman force under Gaius Cosconius had won a string of victories, winning multiple sieges including one at Cannae. A Samnite force under Trebatius now engaged Cosconius, and he was forced to retreat over a river. When the pursuers attempted to cross, Cosconius made a counter-attack. Both sides suffered heavy casualties.
