= Vervactor =

Ancient Roman god of plowing

- Minor god of Fields; God of ploughing

In Roman mythology, Vervactor was the deity of ploughing fallow land. He was one of the 12 helper gods of Ceres. His name was invoked during the Cerealia, along with the other 11 helper gods of Ceres.
