= Roman villa of Rabaçal =

Coordinates: 40°02′18″N 8°27′28″W

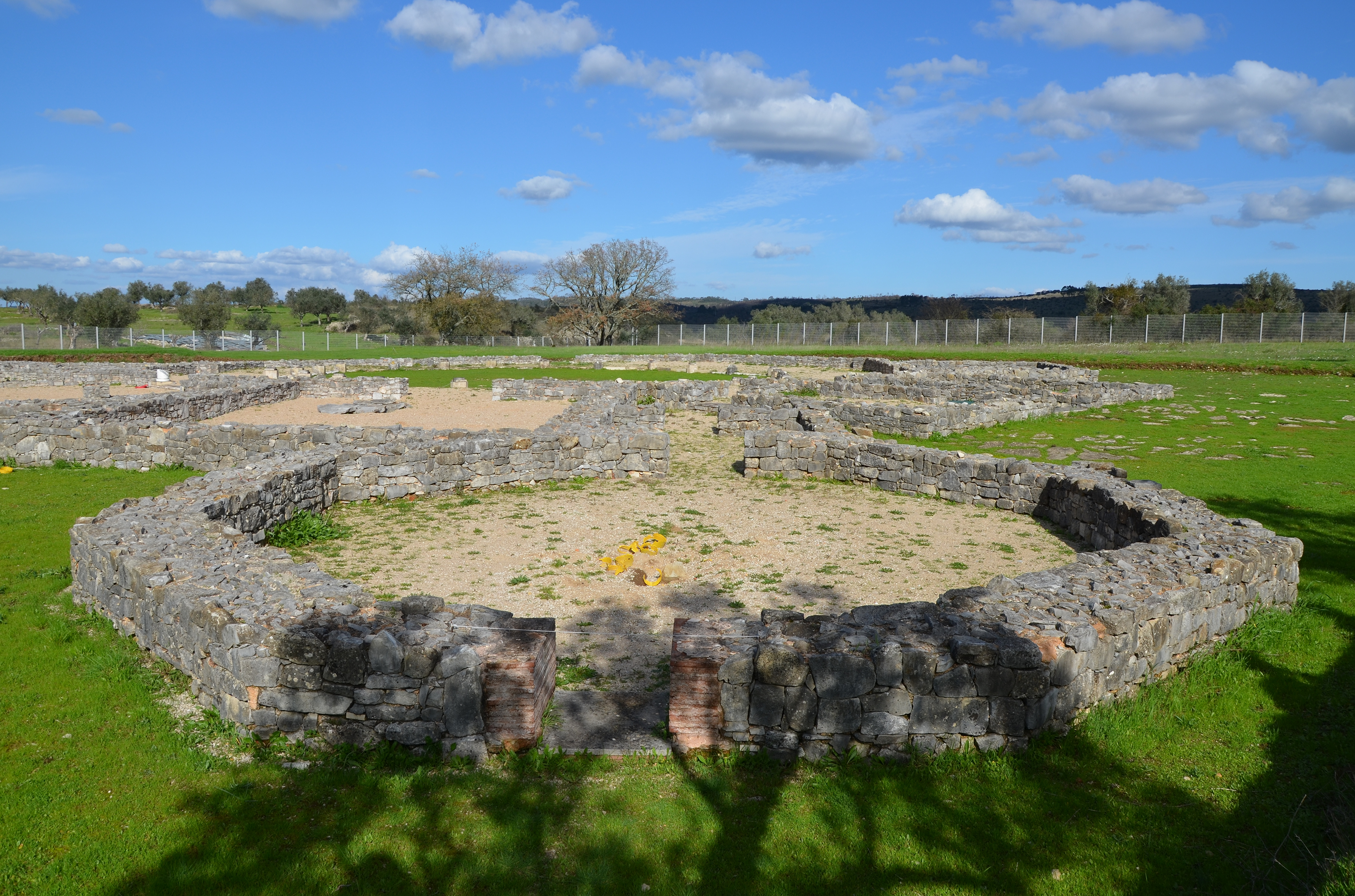
The villa

The Roman villa of Rabaçal in Rabaçal near Penela was located near the Roman road from Olisipo (Lisbon ) to Bracara Augusta (Braga) in Portugal. The excavations begun in 1984 exposed the layout of a villa, the center of which is an octagonal peristyle around which the other rooms are grouped symmetrically. The pars rustica (economic area) was located in the north, the pars urbana (living area) in the western areas. The mosaics which are covered today for protection form a separate group. They are figurative :the seasons, quadriga, a seated female figure and some of the geometrical and vegetal compositions differ from any others existing in Portugal.
