= Porta Gemina =

2nd-century Roman triumphal arch in Pula, Croatia

- Dvojna vrata
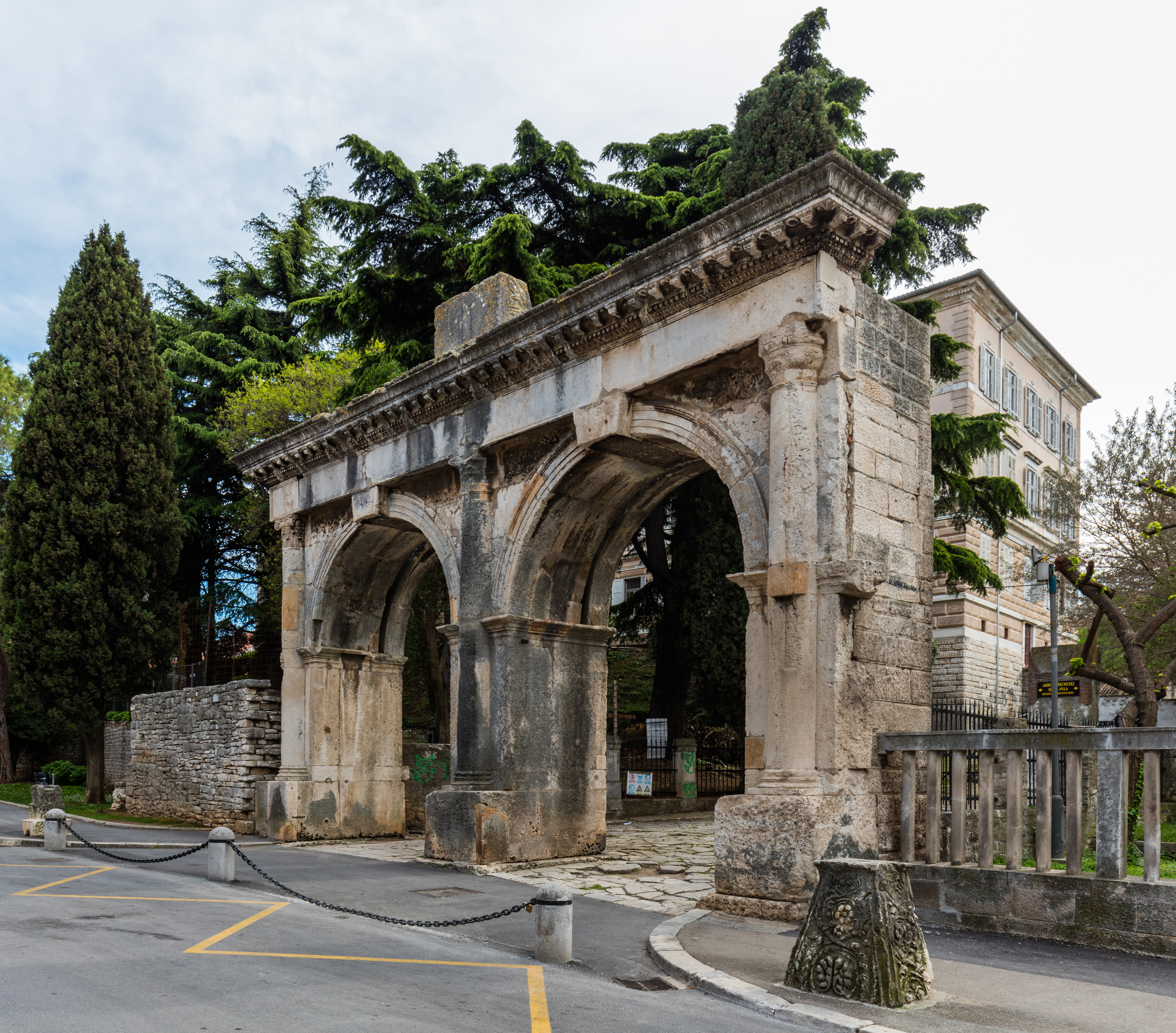
- 44°52′15.3″N 13°50′51.9″E
- Location: Pula, Croatia
- Type: Roman city gate

The Dvojna vrata (Porta Gemina) is a Roman city gate located in Pula, Croatia. It was built during the late 2nd century. Porta Gemina is a double arched gate. It was one of the ten city gates of Pula, standing at the north side of the capitol.

== History ==
In antiquity, Pula was surrounded by walls. In modern times, these were knocked down out of necessity, due to the expansion of the town core. There were about ten city gates, of which the Porta Gemina and part of the walls connecting it to Giardin square are still visible today. In the Middle Ages, the gates were buried underground. They were only recently dug out and brought back to light.

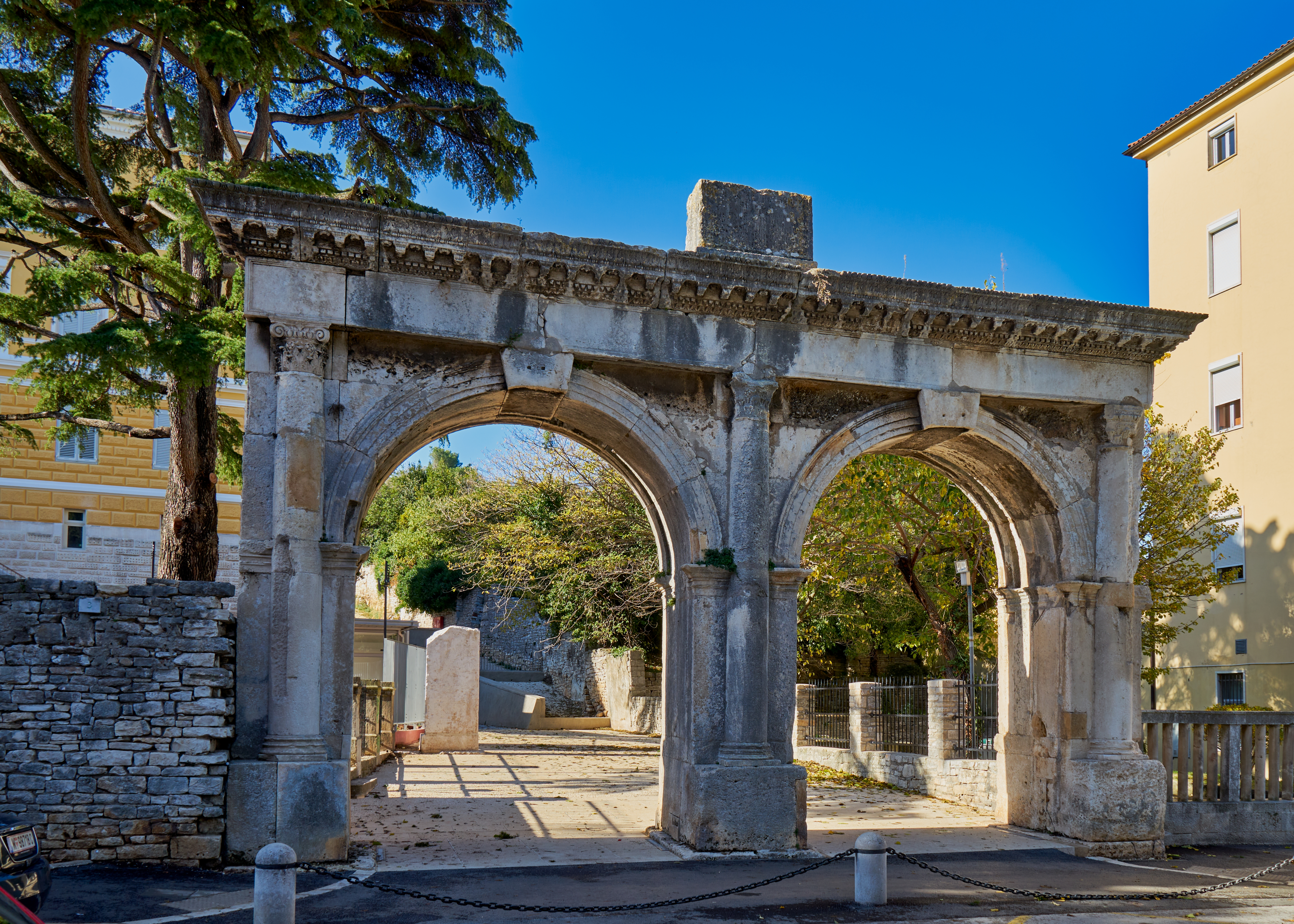

The Dvojna vrata, or Porta Gemina, was named after its two semi-circular openings leading into the town, probably built in the late 2nd century or early 3rd century AD on the remains of an earlier town gate. The two openings are decorated with three pilasters with composite capitals. The relief wreath above connects the composition into a harmonious unit. The slats once used for lowering the lattices in order to close the gate are preserved. The Twin Gates also contain a plate inscribed with the name of Lucius Menacius Priscus, a town councilman and senator, who personally funded the construction of one of the town's water supply networks. The plate wasn't originally part of the monument; it was found next to it, and placed on its upper central part in the late 19th century.

Today, the gates – in front of which were discovered the remains of a partially reconstructed octagonal mausoleum dating to the 2nd or 3rd century AD – lead to the Archaeological Museum of Pula, to the Castle, and a small Roman theatre.

== Description ==
The monument, dating to the late 2nd century or early 3rd century, is relatively well preserved.

The gateway stands opposite the modern citadel, which is built on the site of the ancient capitol. As mentioned, it consists of two arches, though there may have been originally three arched openings.

The double gateway, as its name imply, stands with three pilasters between and on each side of the two arches. The columns support an entablature with its frieze and cornice, but the architrave is wanting. The relief wreath of the cornice connects the whole into a harmonic whole.
