= Lex Julia de maiestate =

The Lex Julia de maiestate, the Roman legislation on treason attributed to Julius Caesar, has not survived, but can be reconstructed in part from the commentaries on it in Part 48 of the Digesta.
