= First Legion =

First Legion may refer to:

- The First Legion (1951 film) U.S. drama film
- Legio I (Ancient Rome), see List of Roman legions
  - Legio I Adiutrix
  - Legio I Armeniaca
  - Legio I Germanica
  - Legio I Iovia
  - Legio I Isaura Sagittaria
  - Legio I Italica
  - Legio I Macriana liberatrix
  - Legio I Maximiana
  - Legio I Minervia
  - Legio I Parthica
- 1st Legion Tercio "Great Captain Gonzalo Fernández de Córdoba", an infantry regiment in the Spanish Legion
- 1st Legions Infantry Division (Poland), an infantry division in the Polish army
- 1st Brigade, Polish Legions, an infantry brigade in the Austro-Hungarian army
