= Isaura =

Isaura may refer to:

== History ==
- Isaura Palaea, ancient settlement in Isauria
- Isaura Nea, ancient settlement in Isauria
- Isaura, feminine singular of Isauri, the inhabitants of Isauria
- several Roman legions:
  - Legio I Isaura Sagittaria
  - Legio II Isaura
  - Legio III Isaura
- Titular bishopric of Isaura

== People ==
=== Given name ===
- Isaura (singer) (born 1989), Portuguese singer
- Isaura Borges Coelho (1926–2019), Portuguese activist
- Isaura Espinoza (born 1960), Mexican actress
- Isaura Gomes (born 1944), Cape Verdean politician
- Isaura Leal Fernández (born 1959), Spanish politician
- Isaura Maenhaut (born 1998), Belgian sailor
- Isaura Marcos Sánchez (born 1959), Spanish cloistered nun and photographer
- Isaura Menin (born 1994), Brazilian handballer
- Isaura Morais (born 1966), Portuguese politician
- Isaura Navarro (born 1973), Spanish politician
- Isaura Nyusi (born 1962), Mozambican civil servant
- Maria Isaura Pereira de Queiroz (1918–2018), Brazilian sociologist

=== Surname ===
- Amalia de Isaura (1887–1971), Spanish actress

== Other ==
- Isaura S.A., Argentine agrochemical company
- Isaura, synonym of the flower plant genus Stephanotis
- Isaura, synonym of the clam shrimp genus Cyzicus

== See also ==
- A Escrava Isaura (disambiguation)
- Isaurian (disambiguation)
- Isauria
