= Second Legion =

Legio II (Latin for "Legion 2") may refer to:

- Legio II Adiutrix, the Second Rescuer Legion
- Legio II Gallica, the Second Gallic Legion
- Legio II Italica, the Second Italian Legion
- Legio II Herculia, the Second Herculean Legion
- Legio II Augusta, the Second Augustan Legion
- Legio II Armeniaca, the Second Armenian Legion
- Legio II Flavia Virtutis, the Brave Second Flavian Legion
- Legio II Flavia Constantia, the Reliable Second Flavian Legion
- Legio II Traiana Fortis, the Valiant Second Trajanian Legion
- Legio II Isaura, the Second Isaurian Legion
- Legio II Parthica, the Second Parthian Legion
