= Legio VI =

Legio VI can refer to any of the following Roman legions

- Legio VI Ferrata, which served under Julius Caesar and later Mark Antony and Augustus Caesar
- Legio VI Hispana, a little-known legion which might have been founded by Septimus Severus
- Legio VI Victrix, which served under Augustus Caesar
- Legio VI Herculia, levied by the emperor Diocletian

== See also ==
- List of Roman legions
