= Legio I Flavia Constantia =

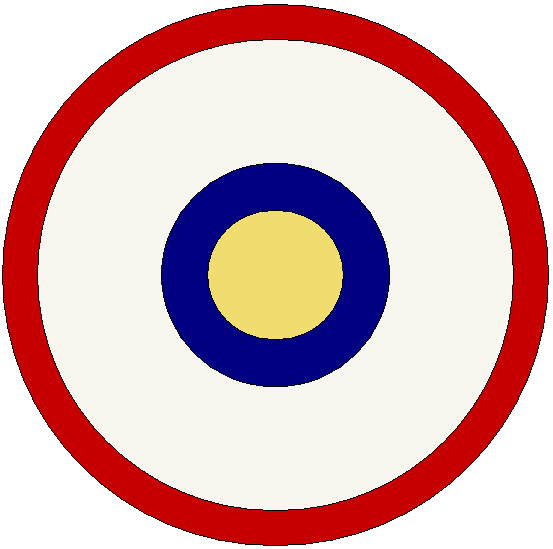
Shield pattern of the Legio I Flavia Constantia, according to the Notitia Dignitatum.

Legio I Flavia Constantia was a Roman legion, mentioned in the Notitia Dignitatum as a comitatenses (field army) unit stationed in the Eastern Empire.

The name of the unit means "reliable Flavian legion". Jona Lendering argues that this indicates it was founded in the reign of an emperor named Constantius of the Flavian dynasty, and therefore must have been founded by Constantius II (r. 337–361), the only Flavius Constantius that ruled the Eastern Empire. One alternative explanation is that it originated as a vexillatio (detachment) of Legio I Flavia Gallicana Constantia, founded by Constantius Chlorus and stationed in Armorica in Gaul. Another is that it was originally called Legio IV Galeriana Thebeorum, named after Galerius and renamed by his rivals after his death.

According to Ammianus Marcellinus, Primus Flavia Constantia was stationed with Legio I Parthica in Singara until 360, when the city was conquered by Shapur II of the Sasanian Empire. The survivors of the siege were taken to Persia as prisoners.

== See also ==
- List of Roman legions

== See also ==
- Legio II Flavia Constantia
