= AD 68 =

AD 68 in various calendars
- Gregorian calendar: AD 68; LXVIII
- Ab urbe condita: 821
- Assyrian calendar: 4818
- Balinese saka calendar: N/A
- Bengali calendar: −526 – −525
- Berber calendar: 1018
- Buddhist calendar: 612
- Burmese calendar: −570
- Byzantine calendar: 5576–5577
- Chinese calendar: 丁卯年 (Fire Rabbit); 2765 or 2558 — to — 戊辰年 (Earth Dragon); 2766 or 2559
- Coptic calendar: −216 – −215
- Discordian calendar: 1234
- Ethiopian calendar: 60–61
- Hebrew calendar: 3828–3829
- Hindu calendars
- Vikram Samvat: 124–125
- Shaka Samvat: N/A
- Kali Yuga: 3168–3169
- Holocene calendar: 10068
- Iranian calendar: 554 BP – 553 BP
- Islamic calendar: 571 BH – 570 BH
- Javanese calendar: N/A
- Julian calendar: AD 68; LXVIII
- Korean calendar: 2401
- Minguo calendar: 1844 before ROC 民前1844年
- Nanakshahi calendar: −1400
- Seleucid era: 379/380 AG
- Thai solar calendar: 610–611
- Tibetan calendar: མེ་མོ་ཡོས་ལོ་ (female Fire-Hare); 194 or −187 or −959 — to — ས་ཕོ་འབྲུག་ལོ་ (male Earth-Dragon); 195 or −186 or −958

AD 68 (LXVIII) was a leap year starting on Friday of the Julian calendar. At the time, it was known as the Year of the Consulship of Silius Italicus and Trachalus, or the start of the Year of the Four Emperors (or, less frequently, year 821 Ab urbe condita). The denomination AD 68 for this year has been used since the early medieval period, when the Anno Domini calendar era became the prevalent method in Europe for naming years. These are now used throughout the world.

== Events ==
=== By place ===
==== Roman Empire ====
- Final year that Tacitus records Annals, a written history of the Roman Empire.
- Lucius Clodius Macer revolts against the reign of Nero.
- The Senate declares Nero as persona non grata.
- June 9 – Emperor Nero commits suicide four miles outside Rome. He is deserted by the Praetorian Guard, and then stabs himself in the throat.
- June 9 – The Roman Senate accepts Servius Sulpicius Galba, as Roman Emperor.
- Legio I Macriana liberatrix and Legio I Adiutrix are created.
- Marcus Ulpius Trajanus, father of Trajan, becomes consul.
- Trajan moves to Scythopolis and crosses the Jordan River with Legio X Fretensis. He lays siege to Jericho and destroys the monastery of Qumran, where the Dead Sea Scrolls are originated.
- Winter – Titus sets up camp at Jericho and the Romans cut off escape routes toward Jerusalem.
- Venutius successfully deposes his wife Cartimandua and becomes the ruler of the Brigantes.

==== Asia ====
- Kingdom of Funan is established in the Mekong Delta comprising present-day Cambodia, Southern Vietnam, Southern Thailand and Eastern Thailand, the first known civilization in Southeast Asia. The capital city is Vyadhapura or modern-day Ba Phnum District in Cambodia.
- King Dodu of Galsa Buyeo offered the country to Taejodae of Goguryeo, Galsa Buyeo was destroyed by Goguryeo.

=== By topic ===
==== Religion ====
- Buddhism officially arrives in China with the building of the White Horse Temple.
- Apostles Peter and Paul are martyred in Rome (latest possible date).
- Ignatius of Antioch becomes the third bishop of Antioch.
- The Essenes place the Dead Sea Scrolls in the caves at Qumran.

== Births ==
- July 4 – Salonia Matidia, niece of Trajan (d. AD 119)
- Flavius Scorpus, Roman charioteer (approximate date)
- Gaius Bruttius Praesens, Roman consul (d. AD 140)

== Deaths ==
- April 25 – Mark the Evangelist, pope of Alexandria
- June 9 – Nero, Roman emperor (suicide) (b. AD 37)
- Ananus ben Ananus, Jewish high priest of Israel
- Basilissa and Anastasia, Christian martyrs (beheaded)
- Gaius Julius Vindex, Roman governor (suicide)
- Lucius Clodius Macer, Roman general (murdered)
- Nymphidius Sabinus, Roman praetorian prefect
- Onesimus, bishop of Byzantium (approximate date)
- Publius Petronius Turpilianus, Roman consul (suicide)
- Tiberius Julius Mithridates, Roman client king
