= Spanish Legion (disambiguation) =

The Spanish Legion (Spanish: Legión Española, La Legión) is a unit of the Spanish army.

Spanish Legion may also refer to:

- Legio IX Hispana, a legion of the ancient Roman army
- Legio VI Hispana, a possible legion of the ancient Roman army

== See also ==
- List of military legions
- List of Roman legions
- Legion (disambiguation)
