= Armeniaca =

Armeniaca, a Latin word meaning from Armenia, may refer to:

- Legio I Armeniaca, a pseudocomitatensis legion of the Late Roman Empire probably created in the late 3rd century
- Legio II Armeniaca, a legion of the late Roman Empire

== Species and genus names ==
- Armeniaca, a synonym of the genus Prunus, particularly Armeniaca vulgaris, a synonym for Prunus armeniaca, the apricot tree
