= List of Roman legions =

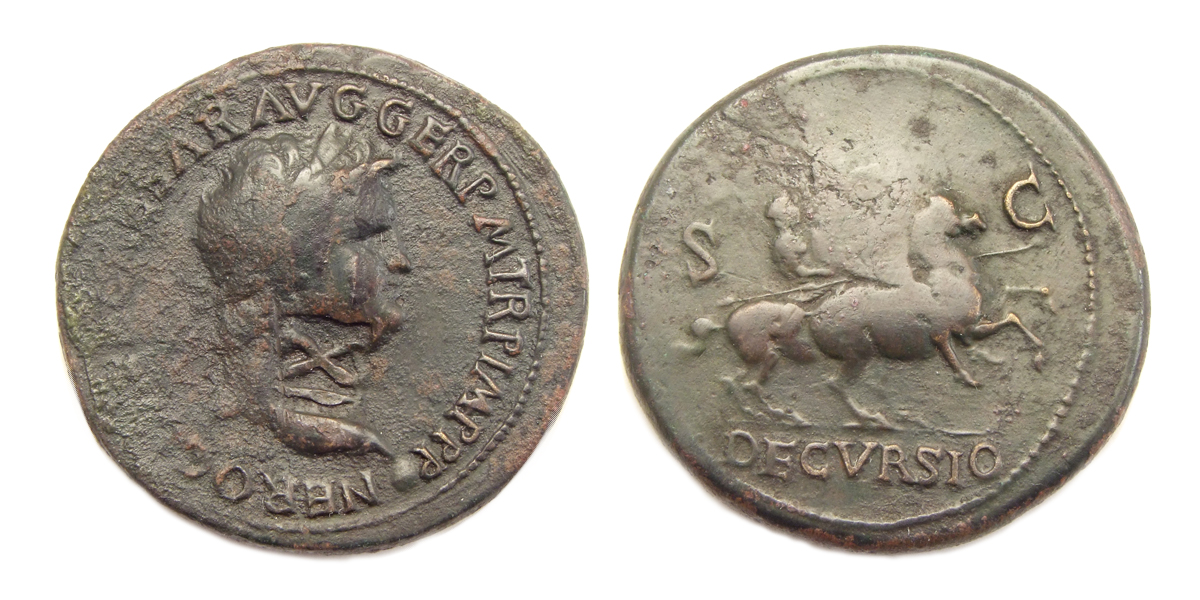
Nero, Sestertius with countermark "X" of Legio X Gemina. Obv: Laureate bust right. Rev: Nero riding horse right, holding spear, DECVRSIO in exergue; S C across fields.

This is a list of Roman legions, including key facts about each legion, primarily focusing on the Principate (early Empire, 27 BC – 284 AD) legions, for which there exists substantial literary, epigraphic and archaeological evidence.

When Augustus became sole ruler in 31 BC, he disbanded about half of the over 50 legions then in existence. The remaining 28 legions became the core of the early Imperial army of the Principate (27 BC – AD 284), most lasting over three centuries. Augustus and his immediate successors transformed legions into permanent units, staffed by entirely career soldiers on standard 25-year terms.

During the Dominate period (near the end of the Empire, 284–476), legions were also professional, but are little understood due to scarcity of evidence compared to the Principate. What is clear is that late legions were radically different in size, structure, and tactical role from their predecessors, despite several retaining early period names. This was the result of the military reforms of Emperors Diocletian and Constantine I, and of further developments during the 4th century.

The legions were identified by Roman numerals, though the spelling sometimes differed from the modern standard. For example, in addition to the spellings "IV", "IX", "XIV", "XVIII" and "XIX", the respective spellings "IIII", "VIIII", "XIIII", "XIIX" and "XVIIII" were commonly used. Legions also bore a cognomen or nickname. Neither a legion's number or cognomen were likely unique enough to identify it, so the combination of the two is usually needed to identify a specific legion. For example, both Legio III Cyrenaica and Legio III Gallica were distinct, long-standing legions of the late Republic and Imperial periods. To visually identify legions, they also bore a specific emblem, a symbolic representation of the legion, frequently an animal or mythological figure, which appeared on the vexillum, a small rectangular flag that served as the legion's standard and carried both the emblem and name of the legion.

== Late Republican legions ==
Republican legions were formed by compulsory levy of Roman citizens (who met a minimum property qualification) and raised whenever it was necessary. Usually they were authorized by the Roman Senate and later disbanded.

Throughout the late Republic, soldiers and commanders served only for short periods intending, respectively, to secure plunder or political advancement from military victory. There is little evidence of changes in the wealth and social backgrounds of the men who joined before and after the opening of recruitment; the pay remained pitiful. Conscription remained the main method by which Rome mustered troops. The evidence for the abolition of property requirements is very weak, and there were no significant changes in population size or demographics that would drive such a reduction. The bulk of recruits were still landed citizens, who would appear poor to the elites authoring the surviving sources. Again, their pay was not enough to sustain professional career in the military, and soldiers generally did not expect land grants after discharge.

In the last century of the Republic, proconsuls governing frontier provinces became increasingly powerful. Their command of standing legions in distant and arduous military campaigns resulted in the allegiance of those units transferring from the Roman state to themselves. These imperatores (lit: victorious generals, from the title imperator they were hailed with by their troops) frequently fell out with each other and started civil wars to seize control of the state, such as Sulla, Caesar, Pompey, Crassus, Mark Antony and Octavian (later Augustus, the first Emperor himself). In this context, the imperatores raised many legions that were not authorised by the Senate, sometimes having to use their own resources. As civil wars were resolved, many of these "private" units would be disbanded, only for more to be raised to fight the next civil war. By the time Augustus emerged as sole ruler of Rome in 31 BC, over 50 legions were in existence, many of which were disbanded.

The legions included in the following list had a long enough history to be somehow remarkable. Most of them were levied by Julius Caesar and later included into Octavian's army, some of them were levied by Mark Antony.

- Fimbrian legions: 86 BC – 66 BC, Lucius Valerius Flaccus. These two legions fought in the Mithridatic Wars.
- Legio I Germanica (Germanic): 48 BC – AD 70 (Revolt of the Batavi), Julius Caesar (emblem: bull)
- Legio II Sabina (Sabine): 43 BC – 4th century AD, early name of the Legio II Augusta, Octavian
- Legio III Cyrenaica (from Cyrene): probably c. 36 BC to (at least) the 5th century, Mark Antony
- Legio III Gallica (Gallic): around 49 BC to at least early 4th century, Julius Caesar (emblem: bull)
- Legio IV Macedonica (Macedonian): 48 BC – AD 70 (renamed by Vespasian), Julius Caesar (emblem: bull, capricorn)
- Legio IV Scythica (from Scythia): c. 42 BC to at least early 5th century, Mark Antony (emblem: capricorn)
- Legio V Macedonica (Macedonian): 43 BC – AD 637, Octavian (emblem: bull)
- Legio V Alaudae (Larks): 52 BC – AD 70 or 86 (destroyed either during the Batavian rebellion or by the Dacians in first Battle of Tapae), Julius Caesar (emblem: elephant)
- Legio VI Ferrata (Ironclad): 52 BC – after AD 250, Julius Caesar (emblem: bull, she-wolf and Romulus and Remus); twin legion of Legio VI Victrix
- Legio VI Victrix (Victorious): 41 BC – after AD 402, Octavian (emblem: bull)
- Legio VII Claudia Pia Fidelis (loyal and faithful to Claudius): before 58 BC – 44 BC, Julius Caesar; disbanded and re-formed by Octavian
- Legio VIII Augusta: 59 BC – 46 BC, Julius Caesar, originally named Gallica, disbanded and re-enlisted by Octavian as Legio VIII Augusta, 44 BC – AD 420
- Legio IX Hispana (Hispanian): before 58 BC – AD 120-161
- Legio X Equestris (Equestrian): before 58 BC – 45 BC, Julius Caesar's personal legion, later renamed as Legio X Gemina
- Legio X Fretensis (of the sea strait): levied by Octavian in 41/40 BC, recorded to have existed at least until the 410s
- Legio XI Claudia: 58 BC – 45 BC, Julius Caesar (emblem: Neptune), disbanded, reconstituted by Octavian
- Legio XII Fulminata (Thunderbolt): 57 BC – AD 45, Julius Caesar, first reconstituted by Lepidus in 43 BC, named by Mark Antony as Legio XII Antiqua (Ancient)
- Legio XIII Gemina (Twin): 57 BC – 45 BC: Julius Caesar, later (41 BC) reconstituted by Octavian. The legion that crossed the Rubicon with Caesar on his assault on Rome.
- Legio XIV Gemina Martia Victrix (Twin martial and victorious): 57 BC – 48 BC: Julius Caesar, destroyed and reconstituted in 53 BC. Reconstituted by Octavian after 41 BC.
- Legio XV Apollinaris (Apollo's) 41 BC – 40 BC, Octavian, raised to end the occupation of Sicily by Sextus Pompeius.
- Legio XVI Gallica (Gallic) 41 BC – 40 BC, Octavian, disbanded after Batavian revolt in AD 70.
- Legio XVII raised by Octavian in 41 BC, destroyed in Teutoburg forest in AD 9 with XVIII and XIX legions.
- Legio XVIII raised by Octavian in 41 BC, destroyed in Teutoburg forest in AD 9 with XVII and XIX legions
- Legio XIX raised by Octavian in 41 BC, destroyed in Teutoburg forest in AD 9 with XVII and XVIII legions
- Legio XX Valeria Victrix (Victorious Valeria) raised by Octavian in 31 BC.
- Legio XX Siciliana: 36 BC – 6 BC, Octavian probably for his campaign against Sextus Pompey.
- Legio XXI Rapax (Predator) raised by Octavian in 31 BC
- Legio XXV: 49 BC – 42 BC, Julius Caesar
- Legio XXVI: 49 BC – 30 BC, Julius Caesar
- legio XXVII: 49 BC – 30 BC, Julius Caesar
- Legio XXVIII: 47 BC – 31 BC, Julius Caesar
- Legio XXIX: 49 BC – 30 BC, Julius Caesar
- Legio XXX Classica (Naval): 48 BC – 41 BC, Julius Caesar

== Early Empire legions ==
The Roman Empire and legions deployed in AD 125, in the time of emperor Hadrian.

Codes for Roman provinces in the table:

AEG	Aegyptus	(Egypt)
AFR	Africa	(Tunisia/Western Libya)
AQ	Aquitania	(South-Western France)
AR	Arabia Petraea	(Jordan/Negev/Sinai)
BRIT	Britannia	(England/Wales)
CAP	Cappadocia	(Central/Eastern Turkey)
DC	Dacia	(Romania/Serbia)
DLM	Dalmatia	(Bosnia-Herzegovina/Croatia/Montenegro/Kosovo/Serbia)
GAL	Galatia	(Central Turkey)
GI	Germania Inferior	(Netherlands/Rhineland)
GS	Germania Superior	(Alsace-Lorraine/Rhineland)
HISP	Hispania Tarraconensis	(Central Spain)
IT	Italia	(Italy)
JUD	Judaea	(Israel/Palestine )
MAUR	Mauretania	(Western Maghreb)
MCD	Macedonia	(Greece/Albania/North Macedonia/Bulgaria)
MI	Moesia Inferior	(Romania/Bulgaria)
MS	Moesia Superior	(Serbia)
NR	Noricum	(Austria)
PAN	Pannonia	(Hungary/Slovakia/Croatia/Slovenia)
RT	Raetia	(Switzerland/Germany)
SYR	Syria	(Syria/Lebanon)

Roman legions of the early Empire (units founded between 59 BC and AD 250)
Legion no. and title (cognomen)	Main legionary base	Emblem	Date founded/ founder	Date disbanded	Castra legionaria (legion bases) * = main base. Start date 31 BC if unspecified	Notes
I Adiutrix	Szőny, Hungary	Capricorn	68 Nero	444	70–86 Moguntiacum (GS); 86 – mid-5th century Brigetio* (PAN)	"1st Rescuer"; received the cognomina Pia Fidelis Bis ("twice loyal and faithful") and Constans ("reliable") sometime in the 3rd century. Raised from marines of Classis Misenensis.
I Germanica	Bonn, Germany	Bull	48 BC Caesar	70 DD	to 16 BC HISP c. 5 BC – AD 70 Bonna* (GI)	Disbanded for cowardice in Batavi revolt
I Italica	Svishtov, Bulgaria	Boar	66 Nero	post 400	70 – early 5th century Novae* (MI)	Raised for aborted Caucasus war
I Macriana Liberatrix			68 Macer	69 DD	(Raised for mutiny against Nero by Macer, gov of AFR)	liberatrix: "Liberator 1st". Disbanded by Galba
I Minervia	Bonn, Germany	Minerva	82 Domitian	post 300	82 – 4th century Bonna* (GI)	"Minerva-revering 1st"
I Parthica	Sinjar, Iraq	Centaur	197 S. Severus	post 400	197 – early 5th century Nisibis* (SYR)	Raised for Severus' Parthian campaign in 197
II Adiutrix	Budapest, Hungary	Capricorn	70 Vespasian	after 269	70–87 BRIT; 87–106 MS; 106 – at least 269 Aquincum* (PAN)	"2nd Rescuer." Raised from marines of Classis Ravennatis
II Augusta	Caerleon, Wales	Capricorn	48 BC Caesar	after 300	to c. AD 9 HISP; 43–74 BRIT; 74 – at least 255 Isca Augusta* (BRIT)	Failed to engage Boudica AD 60. c. 395 at Rutupiae (BRIT)
II Italica	Enns, Austria	She-Wolf	165 M. Aurelius	after 400	180 – c. 400 Lauriacum* (NR)	Capitoline Wolf—Rome's national emblem
II Parthica	Castra Albana, Italy	Centaur	197 S. Severus	after 312	197–218 Castra Albana (IT); 218–234 Apamea (SYR); 238 – c. 300 Castra Albana(IT)	4th century recorded at Bezabde (SYR)
II Traiana	Alexandria, Egypt	Hercules	105 Trajan	after 400	125 – 5th century Nicopolis* (AEG)	Traiana secunda fortis: "Trajan's valliant 2nd"
III Augusta	Batna, Algeria	Pegasus	43 BC Augustus	after 350	to 20 AFR; 20–75 Ammaedara; 74 – after 350+ Lambaesis* (MAUR)	Decimated for cowardice in Mauri war (AD 18)
III Cyrenaica	Busra, Syria		36 BC M. Antony	after 400	to 35 Thebes; 35–125 Alexandria AEG; 125 – 5th century Bostra* AR	"3rd from Cyrene"
III Gallica	Raphanea, Syria	Two Bulls	49 BC Caesar	after 300	31 BC – 4th century Raphanea* (SYR)	tertia Gallica: "3rd from Gaul"
III Italica	Regensburg, Germany	Stork	165 M. Aurelius	after 300	165 – 4th century Castra Regina* (RT)	Raised for war on Marcomanni
III Parthica	Ras al-Ayn, Syria	Bull	197 S. Severus	after 400	197 – 4th century Resaena* (SYR)	Raised for Severus' Parthian campaign in 197
IV Flavia Felix	Belgrade, Serbia	Lion	70 Vespasian	before 400	86–108 Singidunum* MS; 108-118/9 Bersobis* DC; 118/9-4th century Singidunum* (MS)	"Lucky Flavian 4th". Reformed IV Macedon
IV Italica			231 Severus Alexander	after 400		
IV Macedonica	Mainz, Germany	Bull	48 BC Caesar	70 DD	to 43 HISP; 43–70 Moguntiacum* (GS)	Disbanded in Batavi revolt
IV Scythica	Gaziantep, Turkey	Capricorn	42 BC M. Antony	after 400	to 58 MS; 68 – 5th century Zeugma* (SYR)	quarta scythica: "Scythian-conquering 4th"
V Alaudae	Xanten, Germany	Elephant	52 BC Caesar	70 or 86 XX	to 19 BC HISP c. 10 BC – AD 70 Castra Vetera* (GI)	"Larks 5th": feathers in helmet? XX during Batavian rebellion in 70 or at the first Battle of Tapae in 86
V Macedonica	Turda, Romania	Eagle	43 BC Augustus	after 600	6–101 Oescus; 107–161 Troesmis (MI); 166–274 Potaissa* (DC)	Awarded title Pia Constans or Pia Fidelis ("reliable"/"faithful") c. AD 185. Possibly the longest-serving legion.
VI Ferrata	Galilee, Israel	She-Wolf	58 BC Caesar	at least 250 UF	to 71 Raphana (SYR); 135 – at least 250 Caparcotna* (JUD)	"Ironclad 6th". XX at Battle of Edessa 260?
VI Hispana			post 212	after 250 UF	unknown	Only 1 record. XX at Battle of Abrittus 251?
VI Victrix	York, England	Bull	41 BC Augustus	after 400	to 70 Castra Legionis HISP; 71–122 GI; 122 – c. 400 Eburacum* BRIT	"Victorious 6th". Built Hadrian's Wall 122–132
VII Claudia	Kostolac, Serbia	Bull	58 BC Caesar	c. 400	to AD 9 GAL; 9–58 Tilurium DLM; 58 – c. 400 Viminacium* (MS)	Claudia pia Fidelis: title for crushing mutiny AD 42
VII Gemina	León, Spain		68 Galba	c. 400	75 – c. 400 Castra Legionis* HISP	Raised in Hispania by Galba for march on Rome
VIII Augusta	Strasbourg, France	Bull	59 BC Caesar	after 371	9-45 Poetovium; 45–69 Novae MI; 69–86 Mirebeau-sur-Bèze GS; 86 – at least 371 Argentorate* GS	Received the title Bis Augusta ("twice august") for Thracian campaign c. AD 45.
IX Hispana	York, England	Bull	before 58 BC	132? 161?	to 13 BC HISP; AD 9–43 PAN? 71–121 Eburacum* BRIT; 121–130 Nijmegen GI?	XX in Judaea (132)?—or by Parthians in Armenia (161)?
X Fretensis	Jerusalem	Boar	40 BC Augustus	after 400	to 25 BC JUD; 25 BC – AD 66 SYR; 73 – at least c. 400 Hierosolyma*	fretum = Strait of Messina, Naulochus 36 BC
X Gemina	Vienna, Austria	Bull	42 BC Lepidus	after 400	30 BC – AD 63 Petavonium HISP; 63–68 Carnuntum PAN; Petavonium 68–71 HISP; 71–103 Noviomagus GI; 103 – c. 400 Vindobona* PAN	Was X Equestris, Caesar's "mounted" legion
XI Claudia	Silistra, Bulgaria	Neptune	42 BC Augustus	after 400	to 71 DLM; 71–104 Vindonissa RT; 104 – c. 400 Durostorum* MI	Claudia: honoured by Claudius
XII Fulminata	Malatya, Turkey	Thunderbolt	43 BC Lepidus	after 400	to 14 AEG; 14–71 Raphana (SYR); 71 – c. 400 Melitene* (CAP)	"Thunderbolt 12th". Lost aquila in 1st Jewish War
XIII Gemina	Alba Iulia, Romania	Lion	57 BC Caesar	after 400	45–106 Poetovio PAN; 106–270 Apulum* DC; 270–400 MI	"Twinned 13th". Crossed Rubicon with Caesar 49 BC
XIV Gemina	Petronell, Austria	Capricorn	57 BC Caesar	after 400	AD 9–43 Moguntiacum GS; 43–58 Mancetter BRIT; 58–67 Wroxeter BRIT; 67–89 Balkans; 92–106 Vindobona PAN; 106 – c. 400 Carnuntum*	Defeated Boudica's Britons at Watling Street (AD 60)
XV Apollinaris	Saddagh, Turkey	Apollo	41 BC Augustus	after 400	14–62 Carnuntum PAN; 62–73 SYR; 71–115 Carnuntum PAN; 115 – c. 400 Satala* CAP	"Apollo-revering 15th". Fought in First Jewish War
XV Primigenia	Xanten, Germany	Fortuna	39 Caligula	70 XX	39–43 Moguntiacum (GS); 43–70 Castra Vetera* (GI)	Primigenia: goddess of Fate. XX in Batavi revolt
XVI Flavia Firma	Samsat, Turkey	Lion	70 Vespasian	post 300	70–117 Satala (CAP); 117 – at least 300 Samosata* SYR	"Vespasian's steadfast 16th". Reformed XVI Gallica
XVI Gallica	Mainz, Germany	Lion	41 BC Augustus	70 DD	to 43 Moguntiacum* (GS); 43–70 Novaesium* (GI)	Disbanded for cowardice in Batavi revolt
XVII	Xanten, Germany		41 BC Augustus	AD 9 XX	to 15 BC AQ? 15 BC – AD 9 Castra Vetera* (GI)	Destroyed in Teutoburg Forest; lost aquila standard; never rebuilt.
XVIII	Xanten, Germany		41 BC Augustus	AD 9 XX	to 15 BC AQ? 15 BC – AD 9 Castra Vetera* (GI)	Destroyed in Teutoburg Forest; lost aquila; never rebuilt.
XIX	Xanten, Germany		41 BC Augustus	AD 9 XX	to 15 BC unknown 15 BC – AD 9 somewhere in GI	Possibly saw action in the conquest of Rhaetia in 15 BC. Destroyed in Teutoburg Forest; lost aquila; never rebuilt.
XX Valeria Victrix	Chester, England	Boar	31 BC Augustus	after 250 UF	to AD 9 Burnum DLM; 9–43 Oppidum Ubiorum GI; 43–55 Camulodunum* BRIT; 55–66 Burrium* BRIT; 66–78 Viroconium* BRIT; 78–88 Inchtuthil* BRIT; 88 – at least 250 Deva* BRIT	Named for Messalla? XX in Allectus' fall 296?
XXI Rapax	Vindonissa (Windisch, Switzerland)	Capricorn	31 BC Augustus	92 XX	AD 9–43 GI; 43–70 Vindonissa* (RT); 70–89 GI; 89–92 PAN	"Predator 21st". XX by Roxolani Sarmatian tribe PAN
XXII Deiotariana	Alexandria, Egypt		48 BC Deiotarus	132? 161? XX	to c. 8 BC GAL c. 8 BC – at least 123 Alexandria* (AEG)	GAL king "Deiotarus's 22nd". XX by Jewish rebels in 132?—or by Parthians in Armenia in 161?
XXII Primigenia	Mainz, Germany	Hercules	39 Caligula	after 300	39 – c. 300 Moguntiacum* (GS)	Raised for Caligula's German war
XXX Ulpia Victrix	Xanten, Germany	Jupiter	105 Trajan	post 400	105–122 DC; 122 – c. 400 Castra Vetera* (GI)	"Trajan's victorious 30th" (XXX Ulpius Traianus)

=== Legend ===
==== Legion number and title (cognomen) ====
The numbering of the legions is confusing, since several legions shared the same number with others. Augustus numbered the legions he founded himself from I, but also inherited numbers from his predecessors. Each emperor normally numbered the legions he raised himself starting from I. However, even this practice was not consistently followed. For example, Vespasian kept the same numbers as before for legions he raised from disbanded units. Trajan's first legion was numbered XXX because there were 29 other legions in existence at the time it was raised; but the second Trajanic legion was given the sequential number II. XVII, XVIII and XIX, the numbers of the legions annihilated in the Teutoburg Forest, were never used again. (These three legions are without titles, suggesting that in disgrace their titles may have been deliberately forgotten or left unmentioned.) As a result of this somewhat chaotic evolution, the legion's title became necessary to distinguish between legions with the same number.

Legions often carried several titles, awarded after successive campaigns, normally by the ruling emperor e.g. XII Fulminata was also awarded: paterna (fatherly), victrix (victorious), antiqua (venerable), certa constans (reliable, steadfast) and Galliena (Gallienus '). Pia fidelis (loyal and faithful), fidelis constans and others were titles awarded to several legions, sometimes several times to the same legion. Only the most established, commonly used titles are displayed on this table.

The geographical titles indicate

- the country a legion was originally recruited e.g. Italica = from Italy or
- peoples the legion has vanquished e.g.Parthica = victorious over the Parthians

Legions bearing the personal name of an emperor, or of his gens (clan) (e.g. Augusta, Flavia) were either founded by that Emperor or awarded the name as a mark of special favour.

The title Gemina means that two diminished legions have been combined to make one new one.

==== Main legionary base ====
This shows the castra (base) where the legion spent the longest period during the Principate. Legions often shared the same base with other legions. Detachments of legions were often seconded for lengthy periods to other bases and provinces, as operational needs demanded.

==== Emblem ====
Legions often sported more than one emblem at the same time, and occasionally changed them. Legions raised by Caesar mostly carried a bull emblem originally; those of Augustus mostly a Capricorn

==== Date disbanded ====
For legions that are documented into the 4th century and beyond, we do not know when or how they were terminated. For legions disappearing from the record before 284, the reason (certain or likely) is given as:

- XX = annihilated in battle
- DD = disbanded in disgrace
- UF = unknown fate

==== Castra legionaria ====
Indicates the bases (castra) and/or provinces where the legion was based during its history, with dates.

==== Notes ====
Contains points of note, including explanation of titles and details of a legion's fate.

Province names and borders are assumed throughout the Principate period as at 107, during the rule of Trajan, and after the annexation of Dacia and Arabia Petraea. The map above shows provinces at the end of Trajan's reign, 117. They are the same as in 107, except that Armenia and Mesopotamia have been annexed (they were abandoned soon after Trajan's death); and Pannonia has been split into two (the split occurred c. 107). In reality provincial borders were modified several times between 30 BC and 284: this explains any discrepancy with other sources, as to a legion's location at a particular date.

== Late Empire legions ==
Shield pattern of the palatina legion of the Ioviani seniores, according to the Notitia Dignitatum.

Diocletian reorganized the Roman army, in order to better counter the threat of the Germanic peoples of northern Europe as well as that of the Persians from the East. The army was formed by border and field units.

The border (limitanei) units were to occupy the limes, the structured border fortifications, and were formed by professional soldiers with an inferior training.

The field units were to stay well behind the border, and to move quickly where they were needed, with both offensive and defensive roles. Field units were formed by elite soldiers with high-level training and weapons. They were further divided into:

1. Scholae: the personal guard of the Emperor, created by Constantine I to replace the Praetorian Guard;
2. Palatinae: "palace troops" were the highest ranked units, created by Constantine I after he disbanded the Praetorian Guard, it was comprised originally of former guardsmen;
3. Comitatenses: regular field units, some were newly-formed, others were descended from Early-Empire legions;
4. Pseudocomitatenses: these were limitanei units diverted into the field army and often kept there; some Early Empire legions became pseudocomitatenses units.

These units usually numbered between 300 and 2,000 soldiers and some of them kept their original numbering schemes. The primary source for the legions of this era is the Notitia Dignitatum, a late 4th-century document containing all the civil and military offices of both halves of the Roman Empire (revised in c. 420 for the Western Empire).

- Legio I
  - I Armeniaca
  - I Flavia Constantia (reliable Flavian): comitatensis unit under the command of the Magister militum per Orientis
  - I Flavia Gallicana Constantia (reliable Flavian legion from Gallia): pseudocomitatensis under the command of the Magister Peditum per Gallias. The legion was founded by Constantius I Chlorus. The legions objective was to protect the Armorican coast and fight the Roman-British usurper, Allectus.
  - I Flavia Martis (Flavian legion devoted to Mars): pseudocomitatensis. The legion was founded by Constantius Chlorus to fight Allectus. It was stationed in Gaul.
  - I Flavia Pacis (Flavian legion of peace): comitatensis under the command of the Magister Peditum
  - I Flavia Theodosiana: comitatensis.
  - I Illyricorum (of the Illyrians): stationed at the Camp of Diocletian in Palmyra
  - I Iovia (devoted to Jupiter): levied by Diocletian, stationed at Noviodunum in Scythia Minor
  - I Isaura Sagittaria (archers from Isauria): pseudocomitatensis under the command of the Magister militum per Orientis
  - I Iulia Alpina: pseudocomitatensis under the command of the Magister Peditum in Italy. It is unknown who founded the legion although it was probably Crispus or Constans.
  - I Martia possibly based near modern Kaiseraugst. The Legion could have had the surname Victrix. The legion was probably founded by Diocletian. It also may have built forts in Valeria.
  - I Maximiana Thaebanorum (the Thebans of Maximianus): comitatensis unit stationed near Thebes, Egypt, and probably fighting in the battle of Adrianople
  - I Noricorum (of the Noricans): stationed in Noricum. The legion was probably founded by Diocletian to help defend the Danube.
  - I Pontica: the legion was founded by Dioceltian to help defend Pontus Polemoniacus. The legion was stationed in Trapezus.
- Legio II
  - II Armeniaca
  - II Britannica: comitatensis under Magister Peditum
  - II Flavia Constantia: comitatensis under the command of the Magister Peditum
  - II Flavia Virtutis: comitatensis under the command of the Magister Peditum
  - II Herculia (devoted to Hercules): levied by Diocletian, stationed in Scythia Minor
  - II Isaura
  - II Iulia Alpina: pseudocomitatensis under the command of the Magister Peditum, in Comes Illyricum command. It was probably founded by Crispus or Constans. Its objective was to defend Alpes Cottiae
  - II Felix Valentis Thebaeorum: comitatensis
- Legio III
  - III Diocletiana
  - III Flavia Salutis: comitatensis unit of the Late Roman Empire under the command of the Magister Militum in the west. The Legio III Flavia Salutis was raised by either Constantius II or Diocletian and was used to guard North Africa.
  - III Herculea: comitatensis under the command of the Comes Illyricum
  - III Isaura
  - III Iulia Alpina: comitatensis under the command of the Magister Peditum command in Italy
- Legio IV
  - IV Italica
  - IV Martia
  - IV Parthica
- Legio V
  - V Iovia (maybe the Jovians)
  - V Parthica
- Legio VI
  - VI Gemella
  - VI Gallicana
  - VI Herculia (maybe the Herculians)
  - VI Hispana
  - VI Parthica
- Legio XII
  - XII Victrix

== See also ==
- List of Roman auxiliary regiments
- Roman army
- Auxilia
- Roman legion
- Structural history of the Roman military
