= Shapur II's siege of Bezabde =

- Part of the Perso-Roman wars of 337–361
Date	360
Location	Bezabde, Zabdicene (modern-day Turkey)
Result	Sasanian victory

Belligerents
Roman Empire	Sasanian Empire

Commanders and leaders
Unknown	Shapur II

Strength
Legio II Parthica; Legio II Armeniaca; Legio II Flavia Virtutis Local archers	

Shapur II besieged the fortress city of Bezabde in Zabdicene in 360, held by the Romans.

Despite adamant resistance from three Roman legions and local archers, the Sasanians led by Shapur II successfully besieged and captured Bezabde. A battering-ram reportedly brought down one of the towers, through which the besiegers entered the city.

Later that year, Constantius II tried to retake Bezabde, but was unsuccessful.

== Sources ==
- Crow, James (2018a). "Bezabde". In Nicholson, Oliver (ed.). The Oxford Dictionary of Late Antiquity. Oxford University Press. ISBN 978-0-19-866277-8.
- Crow, James (2018b). "Zabdicene". In Nicholson, Oliver (ed.). The Oxford Dictionary of Late Antiquity. Oxford University Press. ISBN 978-0-19-866277-8.
- Whitby, Michael (2013). "Siege Warfare and Counter-Siege Tactics in Late Antiquity (ca. 250–640)". In Sarantis, Alexander; Christie, Neil (eds.). War and Warfare in Late Antiquity: Current Perspectives. Brill. ISBN 978-9004252578.
