= Constantius II's siege of Bezabde =

CE 360 siege of the Bezabde in Zabdicene

- Part of the Perso-Roman wars of 337–361
Date	360
Location	Bezabde, Zabdicene (modern-day Turkey)
Result	Sasanian victory

Belligerents
Roman Empire	Sasanian Empire

Commanders and leaders
Constantius II	Shapur II

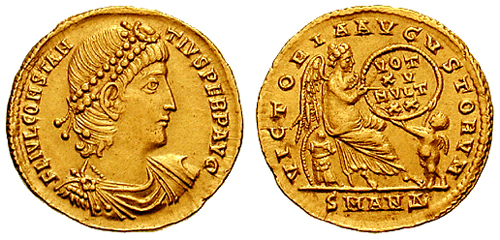

Constantius II besieged the fortress city of Bezabde in Zabdicene in 360, held by the Sasanians. The Sasanians successfully defended the fortress city against the Roman attack.

The Romans had lost Bezabde earlier that year to the Sasanians following a siege led by Shapur II.

== Sources ==
- Crow, James (2018a). "Bezabde". In Nicholson, Oliver (ed.). The Oxford Dictionary of Late Antiquity. Oxford University Press. ISBN 978-0-19-866277-8.
- Crow, James (2018b). "Zabdicene". In Nicholson, Oliver (ed.). The Oxford Dictionary of Late Antiquity. Oxford University Press. ISBN 978-0-19-866277-8.
- Whitby, Michael (2013). "Siege Warfare and Counter-Siege Tactics in Late Antiquity (ca. 250–640)". In Sarantis, Alexander; Christie, Neil (eds.). War and Warfare in Late Antiquity: Current Perspectives. Brill. ISBN 978-9004252578.
