= Fifth Legion =

5th Legion may refer to any of the following:

Roman legions

- Legio V Iovia, a Roman legion levied by Diocletian in the end of the 3rd century, and was still in service at the beginning of the 5th century.
- Legio V Alaudae ("Lark-crested Fifth Legion"), sometimes also known as Gallica, was a legion of the Imperial Roman army founded in 52 BC
- Legio V Macedonica, one of the original twenty-eight legions raised by Octavian

Other militaries

- Syrian Arab Army Fifth Corps also called the Fifth Legion
- Communist Fifth Regiment during the Spanish Civil War.
