= Battle of Mediolanum =

Battle during the Roman-Germanic wars (259)

Coordinates: 45.466667°N 9.166667°E

- Part of the Crisis of the Third Century; Roman–Alamanni conflict and Roman–Germanic Wars
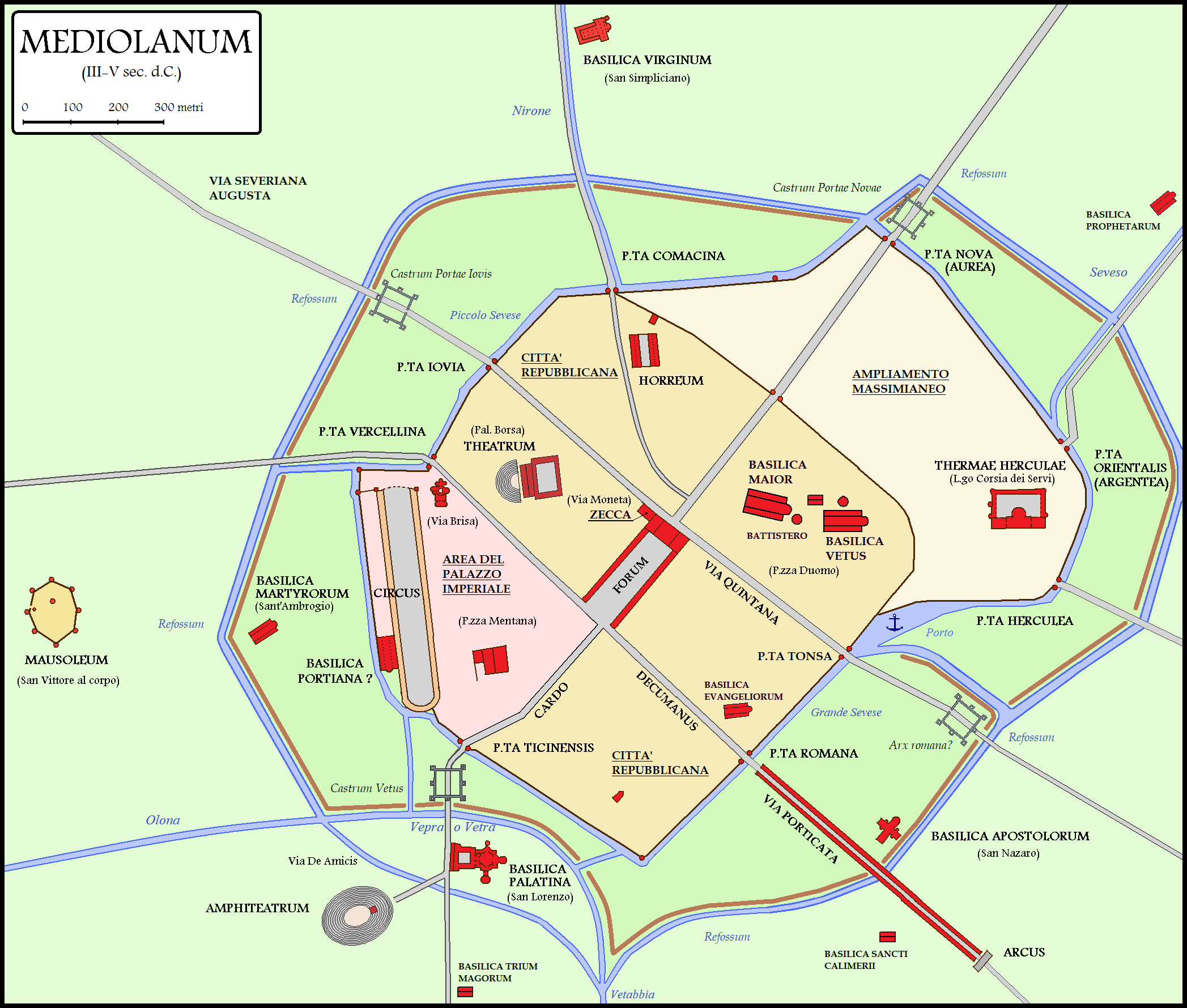
- Map of Roman Mediolanum
Date	259 AD
Location	Mediolanum, Roman Empire (today Milan, Italy)
Result	Roman victory
Territorial changes	Some parts of Agri Decumates occupied by Alemanni

Belligerents
Roman Empire	Alemanni

Commanders and leaders
Gallienus	Unknown

Strength
60,000 armed	300,000 warriors (including civilians)

Casualties and losses
Unknown	Total

The Battle of Mediolanum took place in 259, between the Alemanni and the Roman legions under the command of Emperor Gallienus.

== Background ==
When Roman Emperor Valerian rose to power in October 253, he had his son Gallienus elevated to the position of co-emperor. While Valerian was fighting against the Sassanid Empire and the Goths, who by that time had sacked Thrace and Asia Minor, Gallienus remained in Italia, in charge of defending the Roman Empire's borders there from Germanic tribes ("barbarians").

In the Western half of the Empire, the border situation was difficult. The Danubian frontier faced continuous barbarian attacks. Gallienus marched with military reinforcements from Gaul towards Dacia and Moesia to confront the barbarian threat. The situation was so perilous that in 259, the legions of Pannonia and Moesia rebelled and declared Ingenuus as emperor. Gallienus eventually reunited the Rhine, left behind Legio II Parthica to defend it, and went off to subdue the barbarians.

== Preliminary moves ==
Within the borders of the Rhine River and the Alps, a Germanic confederation, the Alamanni, who occupied a good part of the Agri Decumates (the territory located between the mouth of the Rhine and the Danube), crossed the Alpine passes and attacked the fertile plain of the Po River. The sacking of the area instilled fear in the city of Rome, the empire's capital, as it had yet to become a walled city. The Senate of Rome hastily organized a contingency of plebs for combat in an attempt to ensure that the shrinking army was capable of protecting the city. Gallienus had just defeated the pretender Ingenuus when news arrived of the invasion by the Alamanni. He marched off with the legions I Adiutrix, II Italica, and II Parthica to intercept the barbarians in Italy. By then, according to the Byzantine historian Joannes Zonaras, the Alamanni had retreated before the unexpected resistance of the citizens of Rome and its Senate.

== Battle ==
When Gallienus arrived in the Po valley, he found the Alamanni in the vicinity of Mediolanum, present day Milan. According to Zonaras, 300,000 Alamanni fell in the ensuing battle and the emperor received the title Germanicus Maximus.

== Aftermath ==
The Alamanni's success in attacking into the Roman Empire once more revealed the weakness of the centuries-old tradition of posting Rome's legions near the frontiers without providing adequate defence within the empire's borders. The battle of Mediolanum demonstrated to the Romans the vulnerability of Italy and the value of swift, flexible military units. Afterward, Gallienus enacted a major reform by introducing a highly mobile field army composed mainly of cavalry (vexillationes). The main units were under the control of his general, Aureolus, and headquartered in Mediolanum, with the mission to protect Italy.

The barbarian attack led the Roman Senate to try to regain its authority by arming and commanding its own military forces to meet the Germanic threat. But, uncomfortable with this challenge to his power, Emperor Gallienus suppressed all of the senate's military prerogatives. The fear caused by the incursion later resulted in Emperor Aurelian having a wall constructed to defend the city of Rome itself.

== Bibliography ==
- Francesco Bertolini. Historia de Roma.
- Michael Grant. Gli Imperatori Romani.
- José M Roldán, José María Blázquez, Arcadio del Castillo. Historia de Roma, Tomo II El Imperio Romano.
- José Manuel Roldán. Historia de Roma.
- Historia Augusta.
- Joannes Zonaras. Epitome Historiarum.
