= Perso-Roman Peace Treaty of 363 =

363 treaty between the Eastern Roman and Sasanian Empires

The Peace Treaty of 363 between the Eastern Roman Empire and the Sasanian Empire was the subsequent treaty from Emperor Julian's Persian expedition. Upon Julian's death, the newly elected Emperor Jovian was forced into signing a humiliating treaty by which territorial and diplomatic concessions were given to the Sasanians.

== Background ==
=== Julian's preparations ===
After his accession to the Roman throne in AD 361, Emperor Julian reinitiated the war against Sasanid Persia. Over the winter of 362–63 Julian established his headquarters in Antioch, and as soon as spring arrived he was ready to take the field. Within a month of his departure from Antioch, a force of around 80,000 had been assembled at Carrhae. This army under Julian marched swiftly south-east along the Euphrates river on route to Ctesiphon, the enemy capital. The remainder of the Roman forces, with the aid of the King of Armenia Arshak II, was ordered to effect a junction with the emperor before the walls of Ctesiphon, marching east by way of Nisibis and then south along the Tigris.

=== Progress of the war ===
The southern arm of the Roman invasion met with some initial success. The Tigris was crossed, and the Sasanian army which contested its passage was defeated and penned up in Ctesiphon. After a vain attempt to penetrate further east to Susa, Julian was forced to abandon his fleet and most of his provisions, and was at length convinced that no option remained to him but a retreat.

On 26 June 363, during the Battle of Samarra, Julian was wounded. His death that night, and the subsequent election by the troops of Jovian as his successor, seemed to secure the end of the campaign. Jovian led the Roman legions to Dura. By the time they had arrived their provisions were exhausted and their attempts to cross the Tigris failed. Jovian, having no recourse, petitioned Shapur for peace.

== Terms of the treaty ==
The terms of the treaty were:

- A thirty years truce
- that the Roman influence in Armenia be renounced
- the return of Arzanene, Moxoene, Zabdicene, Rehimena and Corduene to the Sasanian Empire
- the surrender of Nisibis, Castra Maurorum and Singara to the Sasanian Empire

== See also ==
- Shapur II

== Sources ==
- Bowersock, Glen Warren (1978). Julian the Apostate. Harvard University Press. ISBN 0-674-48881-4.
- Browning, Robert (1978). The Emperor Julian. University of California Press.
- Curran, John (1998). "From Jovian to Theodosius". In Cameron, Averil; Garnsey, Peter (eds.). The Cambridge Ancient History: The Late Empire, A.D. 337-425. Vol. XIII (2nd ed.). Cambridge University Press. pp. 78–110. ISBN 0-521-30200-5.
- Dignas, Beate; Winter, Engelbert (2007). Rome & Persia in Late Antiquity; Neighbours & Rivals. Cambridge University Press.
- Dodgeon, Michael H.; Lieu, Samuel N.C., eds. (2002). The Roman Eastern Frontier and the Persian Wars. Routledge.
- Elton, Hugh (2018). The Roman Empire in Late Antiquity: A Political and Military History. Cambridge University Press.
- Ostrogorsky, George (1995). History of the Byzantine State (4th ed.). Rutgers University Press.
- Potter, David S. (2004). The Roman Empire at Bay, AD 180-395. Taylor & Francis Group.
