= Jovians and Herculians =

Late Roman imperial guard units

Jovians
- Ioviani
- Shield pattern of the palatine legion of Ioviani seniores, according to the Notitia Dignitatum.
- Type: Senior palatine imperial guard units

Herculians
- Herculiani
- Shield pattern of the palatine legion of Herculiani seniores, according to the Notitia Dignitatum.
- Type: Senior palatine imperial guard units

The Jovians (Latin: Ioviani) and Herculians (Latin: Herculiani) were the senior palatine imperial guard units under the rule of Roman Emperor Diocletian (r. 284–305). They continued in existence thereafter as senior units in the field armies of the Western and Eastern Roman Empires.

== History ==
The name originated in the equation of the two co-emperors Diocletian and Maximian with the Roman gods Jove and Hercules. The old-established Praetorian Guard was based at the Castra Praetoria in Rome, and had frequently proved disloyal, making and deposing emperors and even on one occasion in 193 putting the Imperial throne up for auction to the highest bidder (cf: Didius Julianus).

Thus Diocletian, who ruled from Nicomedia, promoted two faithful legions from the Illyricum (Legio V Iovia and VI Herculia), the area he was also descended from, to be the personal protectors of the Roman Emperors. On their promotion, the two old legions were renamed Ioviani and Herculiani. The Praetorian Guard continued to exist until its abolition by Constantine I in ca. 312, and replaced as the imperial guard by the Scholae Palatinae. The two legions however continued to be counted among the senior units of the army, and after its division between East and West, they too were divided.

In the late 4th century document Notitia Dignitatum, they are listed, for the West (bearing the title seniores), as directly under the command of the magister peditum, and for the East (the iuniores, junior to their counterparts in the West), as being under the command of the magister militum praesentalis. In 398, the Jovians and Herculians of the West were part of the small body that invaded Africa and suppressed the Gildonic revolt.

== See also ==
- List of Roman legions
- Primani
