= AD 119 =

119 in various calendars
- Gregorian calendar: 119; CXIX
- Ab urbe condita: 872
- Assyrian calendar: 4869
- Balinese saka calendar: 40–41
- Bengali calendar: −475 – −474
- Berber calendar: 1069
- Buddhist calendar: 663
- Burmese calendar: −519
- Byzantine calendar: 5627–5628
- Chinese calendar: 戊午年 (Earth Horse); 2816 or 2609 — to — 己未年 (Earth Goat); 2817 or 2610
- Coptic calendar: −165 – −164
- Discordian calendar: 1285
- Ethiopian calendar: 111–112
- Hebrew calendar: 3879–3880
- Hindu calendars
- Vikram Samvat: 175–176
- Shaka Samvat: 40–41
- Kali Yuga: 3219–3220
- Holocene calendar: 10119
- Iranian calendar: 503 BP – 502 BP
- Islamic calendar: 518 BH – 517 BH
- Javanese calendar: N/A
- Julian calendar: 119; CXIX
- Korean calendar: 2452
- Minguo calendar: 1793 before ROC 民前1793年
- Nanakshahi calendar: −1349
- Seleucid era: 430/431 AG
- Thai solar calendar: 661–662
- Tibetan calendar: ས་ཕོ་རྟ་ལོ་ (male Earth-Horse); 245 or −136 or −908 — to — ས་མོ་ལུག་ལོ་ (female Earth-Sheep); 246 or −135 or −907

Year 119 (CXIX) was a common year starting on Saturday of the Julian calendar. At the time, it was known as the Year of the Consulship of Hadrianus and Rusticus (or, less frequently, year 872 Ab urbe condita). The denomination 119 for this year has been used since the early medieval period, when the Anno Domini calendar era became the prevalent method in Europe for naming years.

== Events ==
=== By place ===
==== Roman Empire ====
- Emperor Hadrian stations Legio VI Victrix in Roman Britain, to assist in quelling the resistance of a local rebellion. The legion is key in securing the victory, and eventually replaces Legio IX Hispana at Eboracum.
- Hadrian also visits Britain in this year at the request of governor of Britain Quintus Pompeius Falco.
- Salonia Matidia (a niece of former Emperor Trajan) dies. Hadrian delivers her funeral oration, and grants her a temple in Rome.

==== Asia ====
- Reign in Northern India by Nahapana, Scythian king. He attacks the kingdom of Andhra and annexes Southern Rajputana.

== Births ==
- Gaius Bruttius Praesens, Roman politician (approximate date)
- Marina of Aguas Santas, Roman Christian martyr (d. 139)

== Deaths ==
- December 23 – Salonia Matidia, niece of Trajan (b. AD 68)
- Plutarch, Greek historian and biographer (b. AD 46)
- San Secondo of Asti, Roman bishop and martyr
- Serapia, Roman slave and martyr (approximate date)
