= Legio XX Siciliana =

Roman legion

The Legio XX Siciliana (Twentieth Sicilian Legion) was a legion in the Roman army of the late Republic and the Imperial Roman army.

== History ==
The legion was stationed in Hispania Tarraconensis from 25 to 13 BCE. The legion was in Sicilia and Pannonia in 6 BCE. It was disbanded in 41 BCE. Although, in 36 BCE the legion was reassembled for a campaign in Sicily.

== Attested members ==
| Name | Rank | Time Frame | Source |
|---|---|---|---|
| Gaius Marius Stellatina | Pedes | 30 BC - 1 BC | AE 1988, 00396 |
| Aulus Silanus | Signifer | 40 BC - 1 BC | CIL 09, 01625 |

== See also ==
- List of Roman legions
