= Legio I Armeniaca =

Late Roman military unit

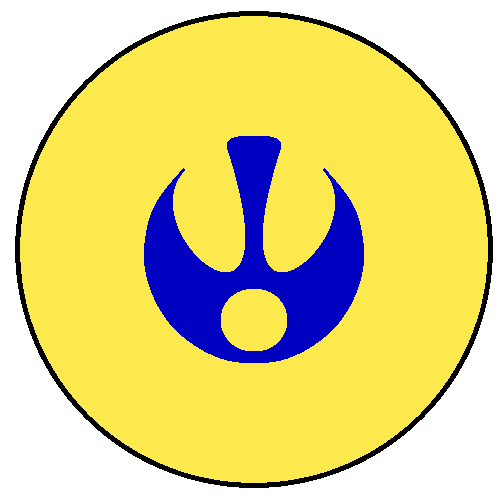
Shield pattern of the Legio I Armeniaca, according to the Notitia Dignitatum.

Legio I Armeniaca was a pseudocomitatensis legion of the Late Roman Empire. The Legio I Armeniaca was likely created in the late 4th century by either Julian the Apostate or Diocletian. It is possible that the name of the legion could mean that it was originally part of the garrison of the Armeniac provinces. This unit, together with its twin legion II Armeniaca, appears to have been included in the imperial field army. It was based in Bezabde until the Persians captured the area in 360. The Legio I Armeniaca took part in Julian's invasion of the Sassanid Empire. The Notitia dignitatum records the legion as being under the command of the magister militum per Orientis around 400.

== See also ==
- List of Roman legions
