= Legio III Isaura =

Roman legion

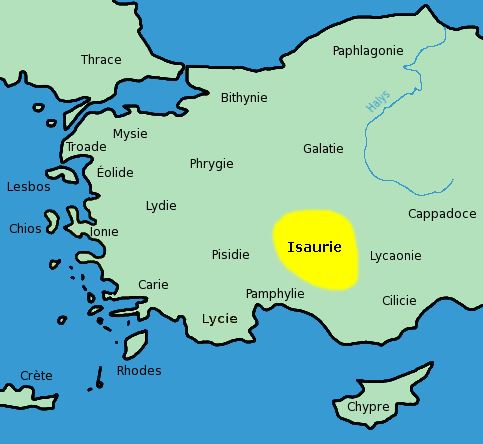
Map of Isauria

Legio III Isaura was a pseudocomitatensis Roman legion, levied no later than under Diocletian, and possibly already present under Probus. As their name suggests, III Isaura and its twin legion II Isaura were guarding the Isauria territory at the time of the Notitia Dignitatum, to defend it from the incursions of the mountain peoples. It is possible that in the beginning they were supported by I Isaura Sagittaria.

== See also ==
- List of Roman legions

== References and external links ==
- livius.org account
