= Legio XII Fulminata =

Roman legion

Map of the Roman Empire in AD 125, under emperor Hadrian, showing the Legio XII Fulminata, stationed at Melitene (Malatya, Turkey), in Cappadocia province, from AD 71 until the 4th century

Legio XII Fulminata ("Thunderbolt Twelfth Legion"), also known as Paterna, Victrix, Antiqua, Certa Constans, and Galliena, was a legion of the Imperial Roman army. It was originally levied by Julius Caesar in 58 BC, and the legion accompanied him during the Gallic Wars until 49 BC. The unit was still guarding the Euphrates River crossing near Melitene at the beginning of the 5th century.

The legion's emblem was a thunderbolt (on a shield fulmen). In later centuries it came to be called commonly, but incorrectly, the Legio Fulminatrix, the Thundering Legion.

== History ==
=== Under the Republic ===
The Twelfth legion, as it is perhaps better known, fought in the Battle against the Nervians, and probably also in the Siege of Alesia. The Twelfth fought at the Battle of Pharsalus (48 BC), when Caesar defeated Pompey. After Caesar won the civil war, the legion was named Victrix, and enlisted in 43 BC by Lepidus and Mark Antony. Mark Antony led the Twelfth, renamed XII Antiqua during his campaign against the Parthian Empire.

During the latest part of Augustus' principality, XII Fulminata served in Syria, camping at Raphana.

=== Under the Empire ===
==== Against the Parthians ====
From his eastern Parthian Empire in present-day Iran and Iraq, King Vologeses I in 58 AD invaded Armenia, a client kingdom of Rome. Emperor Nero ordered Gnaeus Domitius Corbulo, the new Legate of Cappadocia, to manage the matter. Corbulo ordered Legion IV Scythica from Moesia, and along with the III Gallica and VI Ferrata defeated the Parthians, restoring Tigranes VI to the Armenian throne. In 62 AD, the XII Fulminata joined the IV Scythica, now commanded by the new Legate of Cappadocia, Lucius Caesennius Paetus. Both legions were defeated by the Parthians and Armenians at the battle of Rhandeia; after surrendering, the legions were shamed and removed from this theater of war.

==== First Jewish–Roman War ====
In 66, after a Zealot revolt had destroyed the Roman garrison in Jerusalem, the XII Fulminata, with vexillationes of IV Scythica and VI Ferrata, were sent to restore Roman authority. After Cestius Gallus' withdrawal from the siege of the Temple Mount, XII Fulminata was ambushed and defeated by Eleazar ben Simon in the Battle of Beth Horon, losing its aquila. However, XII Fulminata fought well in the last part of the war, and supported its commander T. Flavius Vespasian in his successful bid for the imperial throne. At the end of the war, XII Fulminata and XVI Flavia Firma were sent to guard the Euphrates border, camping at Melitene.

==== Defending the Eastern frontier ====
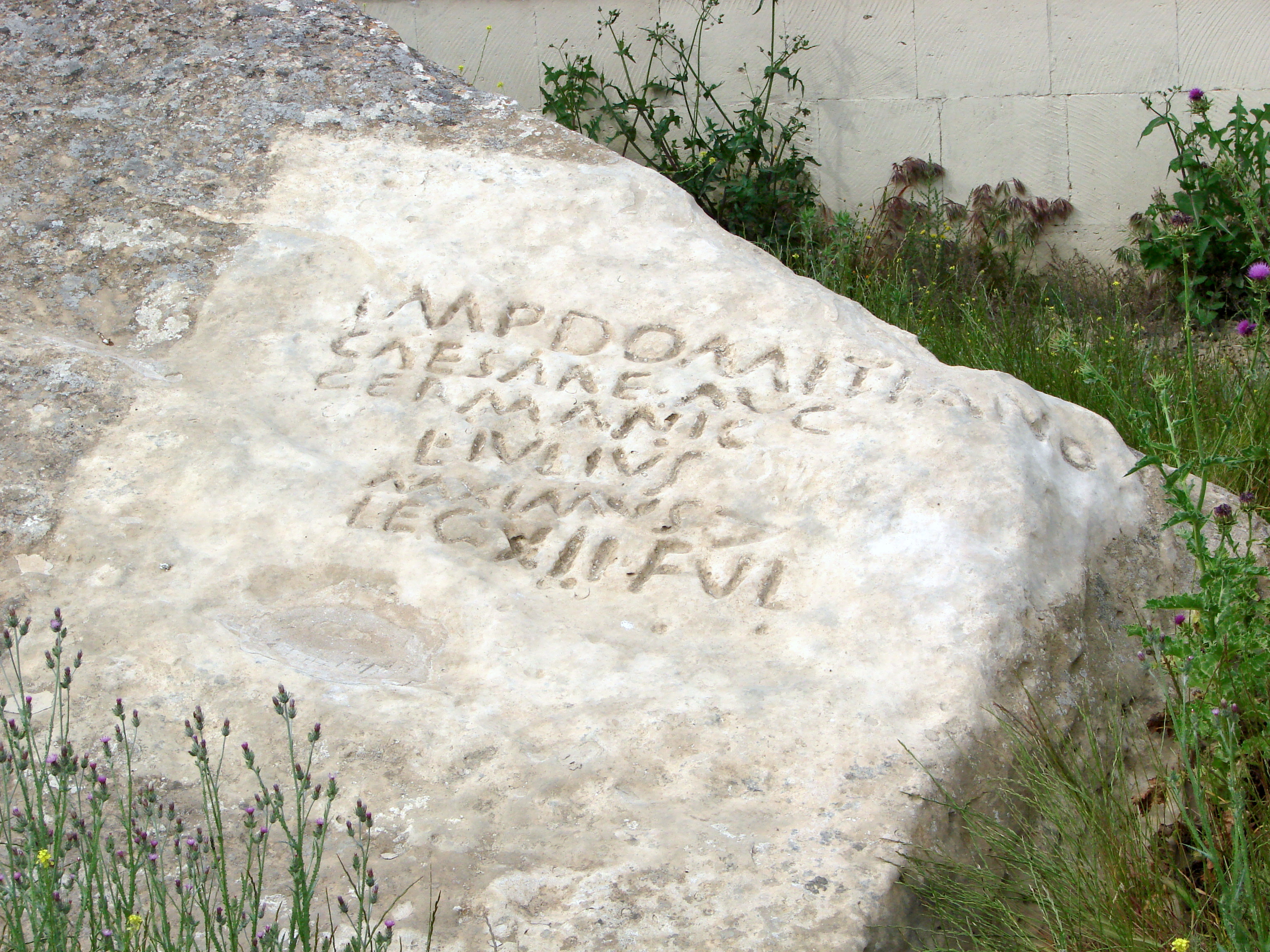
Roman rock inscription in Gobustan, Baku, Azerbaijan, left by Legio XII Fulminata; the easternmost Roman inscription ever found

In 75 AD, the XII Fulminata was in the Caucasus, where Emperor Vespasian had sent the legion to support the allied kingdoms of Iberia and Albania. An inscription presumably from this period has been found in modern-day Azerbaijan which reads:

IMP DOMITIANO CAESARE AVG GERMANIC, LVCIVS IVLIVS MAXIMVS CENTVRIO LEG XII FVL (To Imp(erator) Domitianus Caesar Aug(ustus) Germanicus, (by) Lucius Julius Maximus, Centurion of Leg(ion) XII Ful(minata).)

Some historians argue that the settlement of Ramana near Baku was possibly founded by the Roman troops of Lucius Julius Maximus from Legio XII Fulminata in circa 84-96 AD and derives its name from the Latin Romana. Facts that strengthen this hypothesis include: a military-topographical map of the Caucasus published in 1903 by Russian administrators, which refers to the town as "Romana"; various Roman artifacts found in Absheron region; and records that old(er) inhabitants referred to their town as Romani.

The legion was probably in Armenia during Trajan's campaign of 114 AD, that ended with the annexation of the Kingdom of Armenia.

In 134, the threat of the Alans was subdued by the governor of Cappadocia, Arrian, who defeated the invaders with the aid of XII Fulminata and XV Apollinaris.

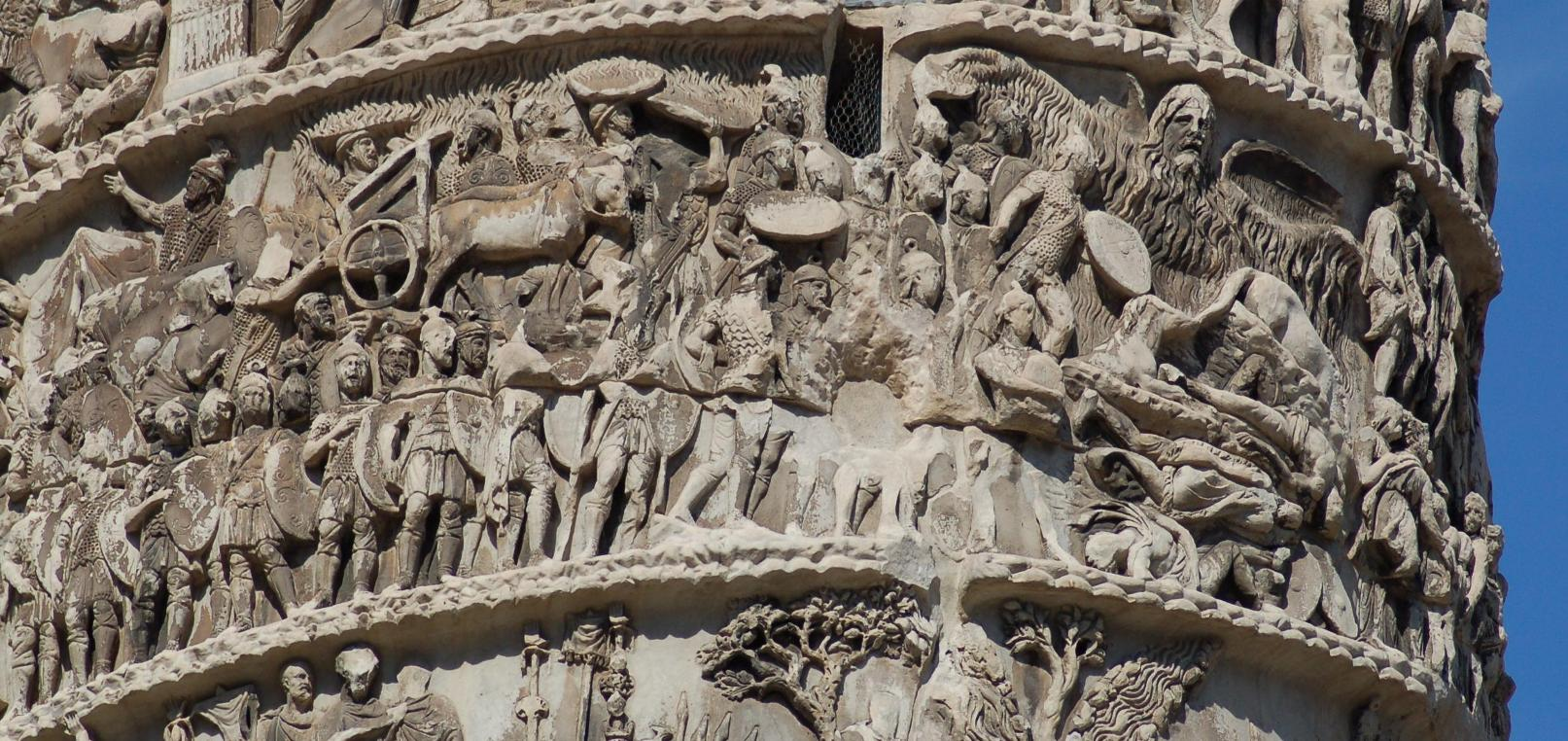
The "Miracle of Rain", from the Column of Marcus Aurelius in Rome.

The Twelfth probably fought in the Parthian campaign of Emperor Lucius Verus, in 162–166, if a mixed unit of XII and XV controlled for some time the newly conquered Armenian capital Artaxata. Emperor Marcus Aurelius commanded the XII Fulminata in his campaign against the Quadi, a people inhabiting an area in modern-day Slovakia, and an episode of a miraculous rain and lightning saving a Twelfth subunit from defeat is reported by the sources. At this time, most of the Twelfth was composed chiefly of Christians. There was a belief that this had led to the emperor issuing a decree forbidding the persecution of the Christians, but this seems to have been based on a forgery.

In 175, the legion was in Melitene, when Avidius Cassius revolted; the Twelfth, having been loyal to the Emperor, obtained the cognomen Certa Constans, "surely constant".

After the death of Emperor Pertinax, 193, XII Fulminata supported the governor of Syria, Pescennius Niger, who was in the end defeated by Emperor Septimius Severus. When the Eastern frontier of the Empire was moved from the Euphrates to the Tigris, the Twelfth stayed in the reserve, possibly as a punishment for its support of Severus' rival.

The region around Melitene was one of the first in which Christian faith spread. Polyeuctes is a martyr under Valerian who was a soldier of the Twelfth.

The Sassanid Empire was a major threat to the Roman power in the East. King Shapur I conquered the base of the XV Apollinaris, Satala (256), and sacked Trapezus (258). Emperor Valerian moved against Shapur, but was defeated and captured. The defeat caused the partial collapse of the Empire, with the secessionistic Gallic Empire in the West and Palmyrene Empire in the East. It is known that the XII Fulminata was under the command of Odaenathus, ruler of the Palmyrene Empire, but also that Emperor Gallienus awarded the legion with the cognomen Galliena.

After these episodes, the records of the Fulminata are scarce. The Palmyrene Empire was reconquered by Aurelian; Emperor Diocletian defeated the Sassanids and moved the frontier to Northern Mesopotamia. The Twelfth, which probably took part to these campaigns, is recorded guarding the frontier of the Euphrates in Melitene, at the beginning of the 5th century (Notitia Dignitatum).

== Attested members ==
Name	Rank	Time frame	Province	Source
Calavius Sabinus	legatus legionis	62	Armenia	Tacitus, Annales, XV.7
Publius Tullius Varro	legatus legionis	between 120 and 125	Cappadocia	CIL XI, 3364
Quintus Caecilius Marcellus Dentilianus	legatus legionis	c. 141-c. 144	Cappadocia	CIL VIII, 14291
Marcus Domitius Valerianus	legatus legionis	? 227-? 229		
Sextus Julius Possessorus	primus pilus	last quarter 1st century	Cappadocia	CIL II, 1180
Gaius Caristanius Fronto Casesianus Julius	tribunus angusticlavius	before 40	Syria	AE 1914, 260 = ILS 9503; AE 2001, 1918
Tiberius Claudius Helvius Secundus	tribunus angusticlavius	before 98	Cappadocia	AE 1925, 44
Tiberius Claudius Speratus	tribunus angusticlavius	before 115	Cappadocia	
Gaius Aelius P.f. Domitianus Gauro	tribunus angusticlavius	between 175 and 180		AE 1888, 125 = ILS 2748
Gaius Julius Pudens	tribunus angusticlavius	after 175		CIL III, 6758 = ILS 2760
Quintus Marcius Dioga	tribunus angusticlavius	last quarter 2nd century		CIL XIV, 4468 = ILS 9501; AE 1946, 95
Lucius Neratius Marcellus	tribunus laticlavius	before 73	Syria	CIL IX, 2456 = ILS 1032
Gaius Minicius Fundanus	tribunus laticlavius	before 95	Cappadocia	ILJug-03, 1627
Gaius Caristanius Julianus	tribunus laticlavius	before 100	Cappadocia	AE 1932, 87
Quintus Voconius Saxa Fidus	tribunus laticlavius	between 115 and 118	Cappadocia	IGRR III.763 = ILS 8828
Gaius Julius Scapula	tribunus laticlavius	140s	Cappadocia	IG II/III 2.4212
Aulus Julius Pompilius Piso	tribunus laticlavius	c. 160		CIL VIII, 2745
Lucius Allus Volusianus	tribunus laticlavius	after 175		AE 1972, 179
Marcus Aelius Aurelius Theo	tribunus laticlavius	first half 3rd century		CIL XI, 376 = ILS 1192

== In popular culture ==
In Rick Riordan's book The Son of Neptune, the Twelfth Legion went to America after the fall of Rome, following the Roman gods, and set up Camp Jupiter in California as a base for Roman demigods.

In Mikhail Bulgakov's book The Master and Margarita, Pontius Pilate mentions the Legion during his meeting with Caiaphas. He threatens using the Legion in bloody pacification of possible future Jewish rebellion, along with auxiliary Arab cavalry.

The fiction book Rome: The Eagle of the Twelfth by M.C. Scott is based on the legion during the Jewish rebellion.

== See also ==
- Forty Martyrs of Sebaste, a group of Roman soldiers from the Legio XII Fulminata, whom Basil of Caesarea portrayed as Christian martyrs.
- List of Roman legions
