= Siege of Singara (360) =

360 siege

- Part of the Perso-Roman wars of 337–361
Date	360
Location	Singara, Mesopotamia
Result	Sasanian victory

Belligerents
Roman Empire	Sasanian Empire

Commanders and leaders
Constantius II	Shapur II

Strength
Legio I Parthica Legio I Flavia Constantia	

The siege of Singara took place in 360, when the Sasanian Empire, under Shapur II, besieged the town of Singara, held by the Roman Empire. The Sasanians successfully captured the town from the Romans.

== Siege ==
The fortifications of Singara—including its moat, both outer and inner walls, and projecting towers—clearly reflected the style of late Roman and early Byzantine military architecture, built to withstand well-equipped siege attacks. Roman historian Ammianus Marcellinus describes the Sassanian siege in 360, during which a massive battering ram finally brought down a round tower that had only recently been repaired. This led to the capture of Singara.

The 1st Flavian and 1st Parthian legions which had formed the garrison, as well as the inhabitants of Singara, were sent into captivity in Sasanid Persia.

== Sources ==
- Crawford, Peter (2016). Constantius II: Usurpers, Eunuchs, and the Antichrist. Pen & Sword. ISBN 978-1783400553.
- Lieu, Samuel (2006). "NISIBIS". Encyclopaedia Iranica.
- Oates, David (1956). "The Roman Frontier in Northern 'Iraq". The Geographical Journal. 122 (2 (Jun.)): 190–199.
- Whitby, Michael (2007). Sabin, Philip; van Wees, Hans; Whitby, Michael (eds.). The Cambridge History of Greek and Roman Warfare, Volume 2 Rome from the Late Republic to the Late Empire. Cambridge University Press. ISBN 978-0521782746.
