= Legio II Flavia Virtutis =

Roman legion

Shield pattern of the Secunda Flavia Virtutis, according to Notitia Dignitatum.

Legio II Flavia Virtutis ("brave Flavian") was a comitatensis Roman legion, levied by Emperor Constantius II (337–361), together with I Flavia Pacis and III Flavia Salutis.

According to Ammianus Marcellinus (Res Gestae xx.7.1), in 360 II Flavia Virtutis was stationed in Bezabde with II Armeniaca and II Parthica, when the King of Persia Shapur II besieged and conquered the city, killing many of the inhabitants.

According to Notitia Dignitatum (in partibus Occidentis, vii), at the beginning of the 5th century, the comitatensis legion Secundani (very probably II Flavia Virtutis) were under the command of the comes Africae.

== See also ==
- List of Roman legions
