= Camp of Diocletian =

Roman military complex in the Syrian Desert

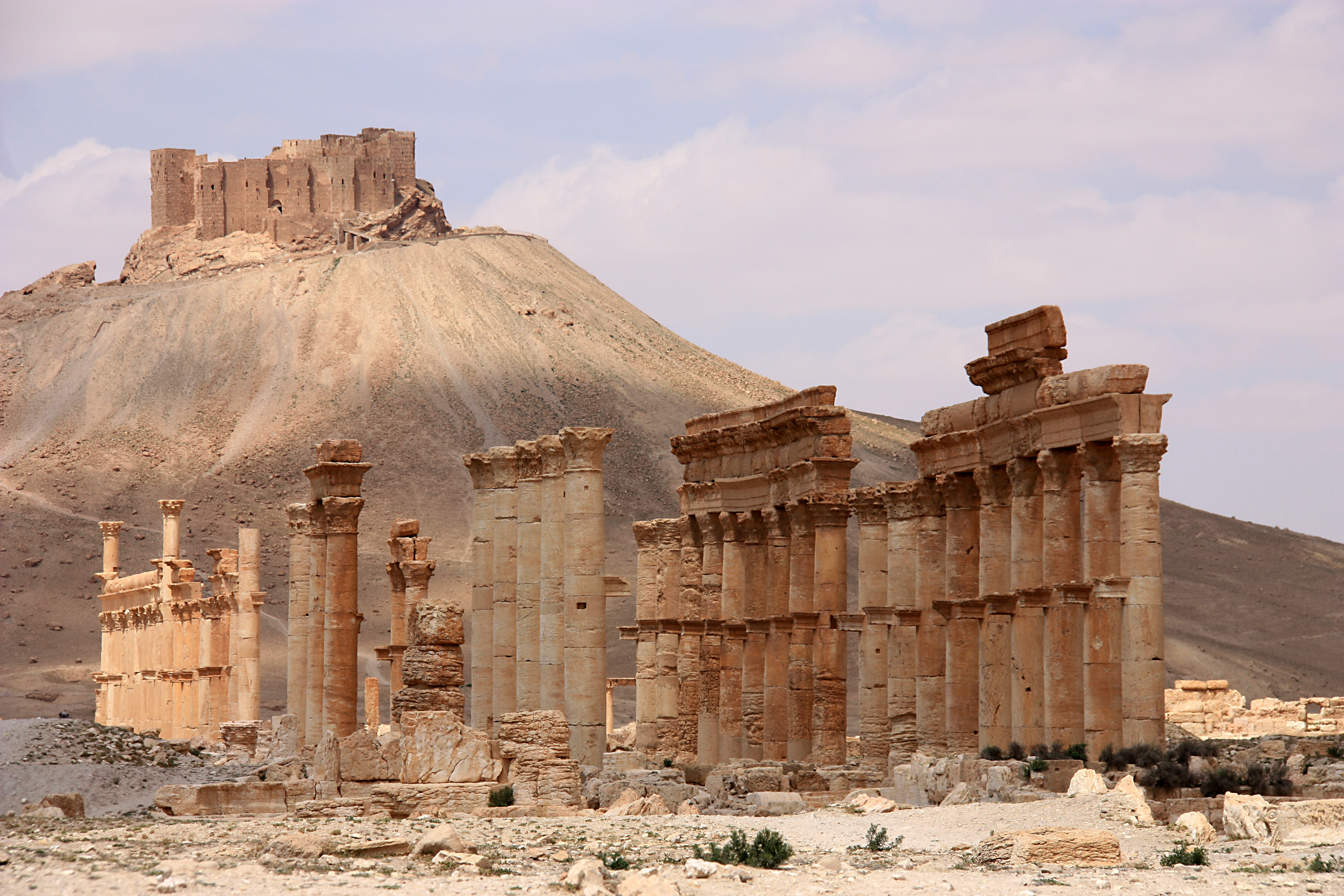
- Remains of the Camp of Diocletian (foreground)

- Location within Syria
- 34.5548°N 38.2610°E
- Type: Military camp
- Periods: Roman
- Location: Palmyra, Syria

Site notes
- Area: 4 hectares (9.9 acres)
- Condition: ruins
- Owner: Public
- Public access: Inaccessible (in a war zone)

UNESCO World Heritage Site
- Type: Cultural
- Criteria: i, ii, iv
- Designated: 1980 (4th session)
- Part of: Site of Palmyra
- Reference no.: 23
- Region: Arab States
- Endangered: 2013–present

The Camp of Diocletian was a Roman military complex, or castra, built in the ancient city of Palmyra in the Syrian Desert. The complex was built under the Roman Emperor Diocletian in the late third-century CE and served as the military headquarters for the Legio I Illyricorum.

== Background ==
During the Crisis of the Third Century, Palmyra broke away from Rome to form the short-lived Palmyrene Empire. The city was recaptured by Aurelian in 272 and, following another unsuccessful rebellion, it was sacked by the Romans in 273.

Following the Roman reconquest, the city was re-fortified with a new set of city walls enclosing a much smaller area. It lost its former importance as a semi-independent trading centre, instead becoming a key military outpost. This is reflected in Palmyra's virtual disappearance from the historical literature; it is listed in the Notitia Dignitatum, a late-4th century record of imperial offices, merely as the base of the Legio I Illyricorum.

== Description of the site ==
The complex may also have included barracks rooms for the soldiers, though it is unclear whether the Roman forces in Palmyra were actually quartered there. They may alternatively have lodged in the city while the "camp" may have functioned as legionary headquarters. The area also enveloped the pre–existing Temple of Allat. The overall design of the site is similar to that of a contemporary camp at Luxor in Egypt and also has similarities with the palace at Antioch and Diocletian's Palace in Split – a sign of how militarised Roman architecture had become in the unsettled climate of the late 3rd century.

The "camp" was designed and built between 293 and 305 CE. An inscription discovered at the temple of the standards proclaims:

[Reparato]res orbis sui et propagatores generis humani dd. pp. Diocletianus [ ] [invictis]simi impp. et Constantius et Maximianus nobb. Caess. castra feliciter condiderunt [curam age]nte Sossiano Hieroclete v[ir] p[erfectissimus], praess. provinciae, d[evoto] n[umini] m[aiestati]q[ue] eorum.

The repairers of their world and propagators of the human race, our lords Diocletian and [ ], the most unconquered emperors, and Constantius [Chlorus] and Maximianus [Galerius], the most noble Caesars, have successfully founded the camp [castra], under the care of Sossianus Hierocles, the most perfect man, governor [praeses] of the province, devoted to their numen and maiestas.

The second name after Diocletian's was erased from the inscription but is probably that of his co-emperor Maximian, who was subjected to damnatio memoriae by Constantine I, under which his name was erased from public inscriptions and images of him were destroyed. The other co-emperors mentioned in the inscription are Constantius Chlorus and Galerius.

It is not clear whether the term castra (conventionally translated as "camp") referred exclusively to the Camp of Diocletian. The wall that separated the military buildings from the civilian settlement at Palmyra was clearly only symbolic and there would have been relatively free movement between the camp and the rest of the city. It is possible that the whole city may have been regarded as a castrum, in the wider sense of a fortified place rather than just the much smaller area of the camp.

== Excavations ==
The site has been excavated by a Polish archaeological team from the University of Warsaw. The excavations, led by Dr. Kazimierz Michalowski, unearthed several structures believed to be guard rooms, staircases and side entrances to the compound. The works also determined that the via praetoria colonnade is a remnant of older structures and probably pre-dates the construction of the camp by a century. It also uncovered the layer of occupation preceding the camp which included a residential quarter and funerary artefacts dating to the first-century CE. Furthermore, the excavations discovered several additions dating to the Byzantine period, including a coin and jewelry hoard.

== Occupation by ISIL ==
The extremist Islamic State of Iraq and the Levant (ISIL) group occupied Palmyra between May 2015 and March 2016. Parts of the ancient city were damaged or destroyed by ISIL, and the Russian television network RT claimed that the Camp of Diocletian had been among the areas affected by the ISIL occupation. However, DigitalGlobe satellite imagery from the end of March 2016 showed that there was no visible change to the status of the area.
