= Legio II Armeniaca =

Late Roman legion

The symbol of the Legio II Armeniaca

Legio II Armeniaca (from Armenia) was a legion of the late Roman Empire. This legion may have been garrisoned in the Roman province of Armenia, but later, together with its twin, I Armeniaca, it was moved into the field army as a pseudocomitatensis legion. The legion is reported to have built a camp in Satala. According to Ammianus Marcellinus, in 360 AD. II Armeniaca was stationed in Bezabde with II Flavia Virtutis and II Parthica. When Shapur II besieged and conquered the city, resulting in the killing of many inhabitants. The II Armeniaca however, survived, since it is cited in the Notitia Dignitatum as being under the command of the Dux Mesopotamiae.

== See also ==
- List of Roman legions
