= Legio II Isaura =

Roman legion

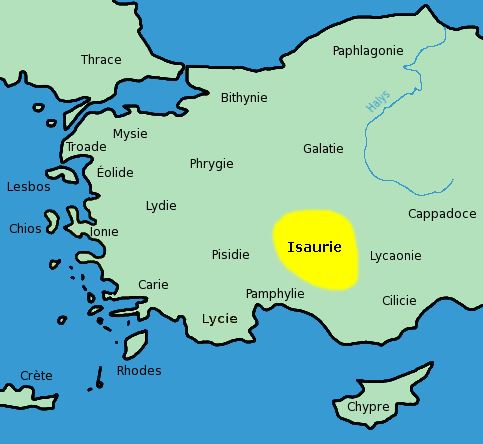

Legio II Isaura was a pseudocomitatensis Roman legion, levied no later than under Diocletian, and possibly already present under Probus. As their name suggests, II Isaura and its twin legion III Isaura were guarding the Isauria territory at the time of the Notitia Dignitatum, to defend it from the incursions of the mountain peoples. It is possible that in the beginning they were supported by I Isaura Sagittaria. According to Ammianus Marcellinus, in 360, they were stationed in Bezabde with II Armeniaca, and II Parthica, when the king of Persia, Shapur II besieged and conquered the city, killing many of the inhabitants.

== See also ==
- List of Roman legions

== References and external links ==
- Ritterling's "Legio", through romanarmy.com
- livius.org account
