= Legio VI Herculia =

Roman legion

Shield pattern of the palatine legion of Herculiani seniores, according to Notitia Dignitatum.

Legio VI Herculia was a Roman legion levied by Diocletian in the end of the 3rd century, and was still in service at the beginning of the 5th century. The cognomen of the legion refers to Hercules, to whom Diocletian's colleague, Maximian (also known as Herculius, "the man like Hercules"), was devoted and identified.

In the tetrarchs provincial reforms, the province of Pannonia Inferior was divided into two, the northern part became Pannonia Valeria and the southern part became Pannonia Secunda. However the two legions of the province were stationed in the north at Brigetio and Aquincum leaving the southern province without any legions stationed there. The tetrarchs levied two more legions, Legio VI Herculia and Legio V Iovia. The VI Herculia had her permanent camp in Teutoburgium (near modern Vukovar) and an advanced castellum in Onagrinum. They also protected the imperial residence of Diocletian in Sirmium which was also the provincial capital of the province and the Praetorian prefecture of Illyricum.

The Notitia Dignitatum locates the legion still in Illyricum at the beginning of the 5th century.

It is possible that some men from this legion and from the V Iovia formed the Herculians and Jovians, the new imperial bodyguard of Diocletian. If this identification is correct, VI Herculia men had the appellative Martiobarbuli, since they were expert in throwing small darts, martiobarbuli, carried by five in the inside of their shields.

== See also ==
- List of Roman legions
