= Fulmen =

Insignia of some units of the Roman army

Iron fulmina (Latin plural: "lightning-bolts") were crossed lightning bolt insignia of some units of the Roman army. Shields of the Legio XII Fulminata showed the spread fires of trident-shaped lightning bolts (Latin: trifida fulgures). The bolts were a reference to Jupiter, most senior of the Roman deities, hurling lightning bolts.

May also refer to Marziale's most used figure of speech, where the meaning of a poem is flipped in the last few sentences. (Fulmen in clausula)
