= Legio II Parthica =

Roman legion

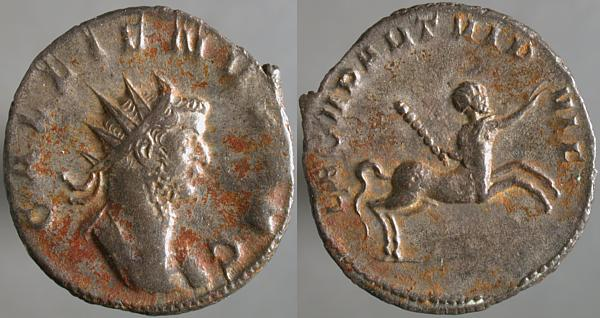
- Antonininaus of Gallienus. Reverse shows centaur and the inscription "LEG II PART VI P VI F".
- Active: 197 to sometime in the 5th century
- Country: Roman Empire
- Type: Roman legion (Marian)
- Role: Infantry assault (some cavalry support)
- Size: Varied over unit lifetime. Approx. 5,500 fighting men + support at the time of creation.
- Garrison/HQ: Castra Albana, Italia (197–218); Apamea, Syria (218–234); Moguntiacum, Germania Superior (234–238); Castra Albana (238 – beginning of the 4th century); Bezabde, Mesopotamia (in 360); Cepha, Mesopotamia (c. 400)
- Nicknames: Parthica, "Parthian" (since 197); Pia Fidelis Felix Aeterna, "forever faithful, loyal and blest" (since 218); V Fidelis V Pia, "Five times loyal, five times faithful" (253/260); VI Fidelis VI Pia, "Six times loyal, six times faithful" (before 260)
- Mascots: Bull and centaur
- Engagements: Septimius Severus Parthian campaign (197); Severus Britannic campaign (208–211); Caracalla Alamannic campaign (213); Battle of Antioch (218); Alexander Severus Sassanid campaign (231); Siege of Bezabde (360) vexillationes participated in many other campaigns

Commanders
- Notable commanders: Septimius Severus (campaign); Caracalla (campaign); Alexander Severus (campaign)

Legio II Parthica ("Parthian-conquering Second Legion") was a legion of the Imperial Roman army founded in AD 197 by the emperor Septimius Severus (r. 193–211), for his campaign against the Parthian Empire, hence the cognomen Parthica. The legion was still active in the beginning of the 5th century. The legion's symbol was a centaur.

== Parthian campaign and Castra Albana (197–4th century) ==
Together with its twin legions I Parthica and III Parthica, the Second Parthian legion was levied for the attack on the eastern frontier. The campaign was a success and Ctesiphon, the Parthian capital was taken and sacked. After this war, II Parthica returned to Italia in 198 and was stationed near Rome, in Castra Albana (Albano Laziale) – it was the first legion stationed in Italia for several centuries. Since it was not garrisoning a Roman province, it functioned both as a reserve that could be used in afflicted parts of the Empire, as well as a security element against possible internal rebellions. Emperors in the 3rd century were very likely to have problems with usurpers, and Severus, by stationing the II Parthica near the capital, was aware of it.

Nevertheless, the legion served in the Severan campaign in Britain of 208–211 and afterwards, under Caracalla against the Germanic tribe of the Alamanni in 213. Next, the legion was again sent to Parthia and their commander Macrinus was responsible for Caracalla's murder in that region in 217. In the following year, however, the II Parthica, stationed in Apamea (Syria), abandoned Macrinus and sided with Elagabalus; the Second supported Elagabalus' rise to purple, defeating Macrinus in the Battle of Antioch. The new emperor awarded the legion with the cognomina Pia Fidelis Felix Aeterna (forever faithful, loyal and pious).

=== Under Severus Alexander and Maximinus ===
In 231, the legion fought under Alexander Severus against the Sassanid Empire, and returned with the emperor to the German provinces. The legion was at Moguntiacum (modern Mainz), when Alexander was assassinated in 235. In the following fight for the power, the II Parthica sided with Maximinus Thrax. In 238, the Roman Senate declared Maximinus persona non grata and nominated Gordian III as emperor. Maximinus then marched on Rome to fight for his rights, taking the II Parthica, among other legions, with him to be stationed again at Castra Albana. What happened next is a good example of the political power of the legions in the 3rd century. The II Parthica weighed the chances of its commander and, concluding that supporting him was not a good move, they killed Maximinus before he could harass the senate. As a reward, they were pardoned for supporting a public enemy and allowed to return to their base and families in the Alban Hills.

=== Whittling away ===
In the next decades they were used as reinforcements in several provinces within the empire and continued to be used as pawns in the constant battles for the imperial throne of the 3rd century. Emperor Gallienus (253-268) awarded the legion with the titles V Fidelis V Pia and VI Fidelis VI Pia (respectively, "Five" and "Six times loyal and faithful").

Where the legion was based when it received these titles from Gallienus is uncertain. Other things being equal one would have thought that Valerian, father and co-regent with Gallienus, would have wanted to take it to the east with him in the late 250s and that it would have been involved in his defeat and capture by King Sapor of the Persians at Edessa in 260. Since it continued as a functioning unit and avoided the subsequent pitfalls of over-identification with the rebellion of the Macrianii and Palmyra's bid for autonomy under Zenobia, and given the honorific title appearing on coins of Gallienus, it is probable that it was under the command of Gallienus, not his father. However unlikely, it is possible that it would have returned to Europe as part of the army of the Macrianii and was forgiven by Gallienus after the latter were defeated. Besides an inscription from Macedonia giving thanks to the god Jupiter for the safety and well-being, "pro salute et incolumitate," of Gallienus, and an inscription from Rome dating to AD 242 giving thanks to the legion's "Genius Gordiana and to Fortuna" for keeping safe emperor Gordian and his spouse, there is little known regarding its fortunes in this period.

=== Under Constantine I ===
The II Parthica was in Italy at the end of the third century, but was almost certainly disbanded by Constantine I the Great after his victory at the Milvian bridge in 312, as we know that this emperor disbanded the imperial guard as a punishment for its support of the usurper Maxentius, and it is likely that this also meant the end of II Parthica.

== In Mesopotamia ==
In the next century, a legion with the same name was garrisoned, together with II Armeniaca and II Flavia Virtutis, at the Roman fortified city of Bezabde (modern Cizre) on the Tigris and from the beginning of the 4th century II Parthica had abandoned Italy.

In 360, the Sassanid King Shapur II attacked and conquered Bezabde.

According to Notitia Dignitatum, II Parthica was in Cepha, Turkey, around 400, under the command of the Dux Mesopotamiae.

== See also ==
- List of Roman legions
