= Legio I Isaura Sagittaria =

Roman legion

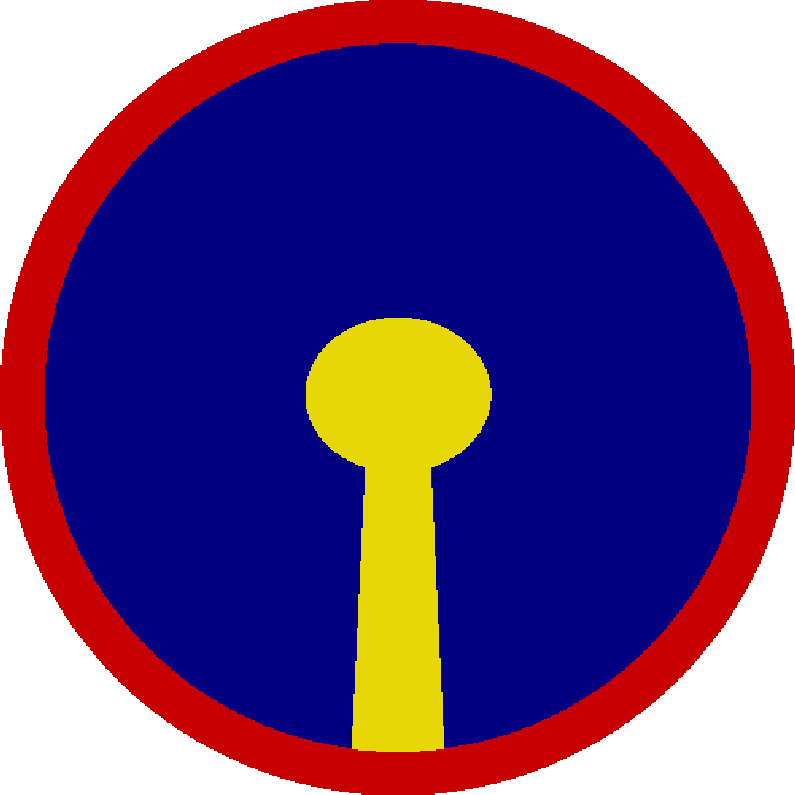
Shieldpattern of Prima Isauria Sagittaria, early 5th century

Legio I Isaura Sagitaria was a pseudocomitatensis Roman legion. The legion was probably created by emperor Probus. It is possible that in the beginning it, together with the II and III Isaura, it was used to defend the Isauria region, The legion campaigned against the tribes of Cilicia. As its name suggests, its legionaries could be used also as archers, an uncommon feature for Roman legions. According to Notitia Dignitatum, in the beginning of the 5th century the I Isaura was under the command of the Magister Militum per Orientem.

== See also ==
- List of Roman legions
