= Legio I Maximiana =

Roman legion

Prima Maximiana unit shield pattern, according to Notitia dignitatum.

The Legio I Maximiana (of Maximian) was a comitatensis Roman legion, probably created by Emperor Diocletian in 296 or 297 AD. The legion was named after Maximianus, a colleague of Diocletian. The I Maximiana was formed together with II Flavia Constantia, to garrison the newly created province Thebaidos, in Aegyptus. As well as protect it from neighboring tribes. Since no Legio I Maximiana is listed as being stationed at Thebes in the Notitia Dignitatum, the designation is interpreted more broadly as of the Thebaid in general. There is also a detachment comitatenses legion known as Legio I Maximiana Thebanorum or Thebaeorum ("Maximian legion of the Thebans"), which is separate unit mentioned in Notitia Dignitatum.

In 354, I Maximiana was located in Thrace, in the city of Adrianople. Thus it is likely that it fought in the Battle of Adrianople, in 378, when emperor Valens was defeated by Goths. According to Notitia Dignitatum, the I Maximiana Thebanorum was still under Thracian command at the start of the 5th century, while the I Maximiana was in Philae (Egypt, south of Aswan), under the dux Thebaidos. There exists also a Theban Legion in the legend of Saint Maurice from the 5th century. According to that tradition, this (Prima Maximiana Thebanorum) was a legion from Thebes that was ordered to move by Maximian. Thus it is sometimes related to I Maximiana. However, according to tradition, the Theban Legion of Saint Maurice was martyred in 286, while the I Maximiana was not founded until ten years later.

== See also ==
- List of Roman legions
