= Legio V Iovia =

Roman legion

Shield pattern of the palatine legion of Ioviani seniores, according to Notitia Dignitatum.

Legio V Iovia was a Roman legion levied by Diocletian in the end of the 3rd century, and was still in service at the beginning of the 5th century. The cognomen of the legion refers to Jupiter, to whom Diocletian (also known as Iovius, "the man like Jupiter") was devoted and identified.

The V Iovia was stationed, together to her sister legion VI Herculia, in Pannonia Secunda, a new province created with the segmentation of the old Pannonia province. The legion received the ordinal "Fifth" because in Pannonia there were already four legions. The purpose of the legion, having her permanent camp in Bononia and an advanced castellum in Onagrinum, was to protect the imperial residence of Diocletian in Sirmium (Illyricum).

The Notitia Dignitatum locates the legion still in Illyricum at the beginning of the 5th century.

It is possible that some men from this legion and from the VI Herculia formed the Jovians and Herculians, the new imperial bodyguard of Diocletian. If this identification is correct, V Iovia men had the appellative martiobarbuli, since they were expert in throwing plumbata, small darts carried by five in the inside of their shields.

== See also ==
- List of Roman legions
