= A Escrava Isaura =

A Escrava Isaura may refer to:

- A Escrava Isaura (novel), an 1875 novel by Bernardo Guimarães
- A Escrava Isaura (1949 film), a Brazilian film of 1949
- Escrava Isaura (1976 TV series), an adaptation of the novel produced by Rede Globo
- A Escrava Isaura (2004 TV series), an adaptation of the novel produced by Rede Record
