= Isaurian =

Isaurian may refer to:

- anything of the region of Isauria or its people
- the Isaurian dynasty that ruled Byzantine Empire from 717 to 802
- the Isaurian language
