= Raphana =

City attested by Pliny the Elder

Coordinates: 33°17′20″N 36°46′12″E

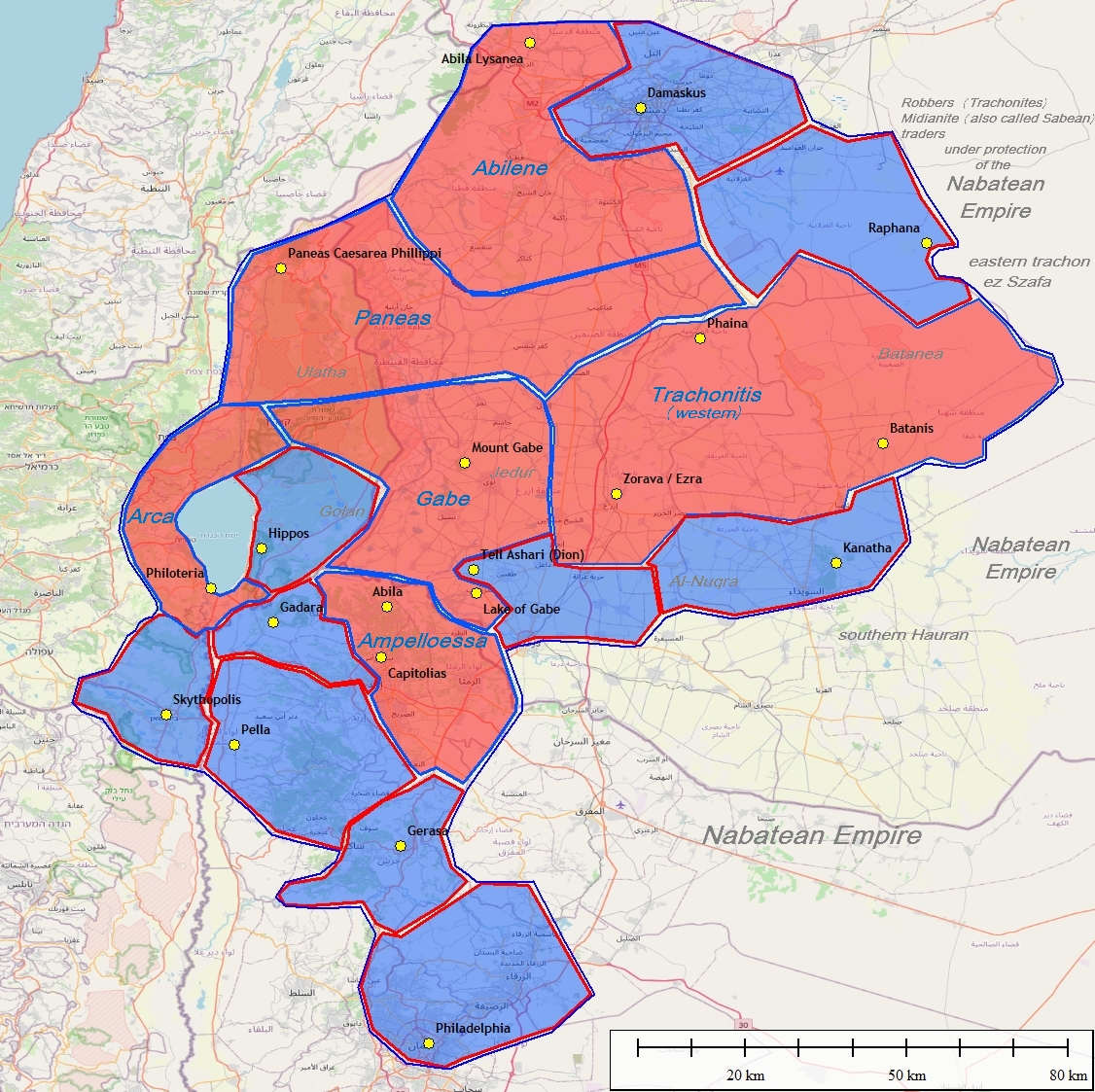
Map of the Decapolis prior 106 A.D.

Raphana (Ραφάνα in Ancient Greek), was one of the Decapolis cities mentioned by Pliny the Elder, within his Naturalis Historia (Book V.74).

Raphana was sought for the last two millennia, after no one could identify this ancient settlement, as it was mostly omitted from maps or in scientific literature.

== Proposed locations ==
Some connected it with Raphon of the Macabbees. Some other looked for a substitution and chose the site of Abila at the northern Jordanian valley of Wadi Queilbeh, because of Abila's important history and its attested connection to the Decapolis region. But, there is no archaeological evidence that Abila has ever had any other ancient name than Abila dekapoleos, Abila Seleukia or also Abila viniferos (mentioned by Eusebius in his Onomastikon (Abila), 12 miles east of Gadara).

Raphana itself was unidentified. Recent research has found a plausible position for Raphana at the northeastern-edge of the Decapolis region. This fits also to the history of Flavius Josephus, who describes the forts around a place called Raepta, which is very plausibly the predecessor settlement of Raphana. For the mentioned connection see also the Pleiades Database for "Raphana" at stoa.org. In some online sites you can read that Raphana was at the "Abilene plain" and some mixed this name again with Abila at Wadi Queilbeh south of the Yarmuk, but the Abilene Plain describes a completely different region and the area around Abila Lysaniae, which is north-west of Damascus and always connected with the Paneas region too. But Abila Lysaniae and its history also have nothing to do with Raphana. The notation at the Notitia Dignitatum at "Arefa" shows us for a later date that there was a military unit, an ala at that location. This connection (with Arefa) you will also find at the above-mentioned Pleiades Database. That such a military camp was normally situated at the border of the ancient empires seems to be clear. Therefore, with a very high plausibility Raphana of the Decapolis, with its predecessor Raepta and its successor Arpha/Arefa, can be found at the Khirbet ar-Rafi'ah ("Ar-Rafi'ah Ruins"), positioned at Ard al-Fanah, at the border between the Arabian Desert and the fertile Ghouta south of Damascus.

For a time the city seems to have been the base camp of the 12th Roman legion, Legio XII Fulminata, as well as of Legio III Gallica.
