= Legio VI Hispana =

Potential Roman legion

Legio VI Hispana ("Sixth (Hispanian) Legion") may have been a legion of the Imperial Roman army. Only a few records attesting a "VI Hispana" were known in 2015. Seyrig (1923) argued that this unit was created in AD 68 and disappeared before 197. Another theory is that VI Hispana was created after 197 and was destroyed in the turmoil of the Empire's Third Century Crisis.

The scarcity and ambiguity of records of "VI Hispana" has led some scholars to doubt that this legion ever existed and that the inscriptions attesting it were erroneous references to the legions VII Gemina or IX Hispana.

== Sources ==
The extant records attesting a "Legio VI Hispana" are as follows:

1. AE (2003) 1014 and 7 other similar inscriptions from Corinth honouring Tiberius Claudius Dinippus, who is described as a military tribune of "VI Hispana" (also called "VI Hispanensis" in 3 of the inscriptions). KEY TEXT: "LEG VI HISP". Date: reign of Nero (AD 54-68)
2. CIL III, 8069: Tile-stamps from Pannonia (Szent Mihaly, Hungary). KEY TEXT: "LEG VI HIS". Date uncertain.
3. CIL V, 4381: (from Brescia, It.): KEY TEXT: "[LE]G HI/////". Date ca. AD 100
4. Inscriptiones Aquileiae I.310. From Aquileia in northeastern Italy. Votive altar. The text reads: "[Dedicated] to the invincible god Mithras. Lucius Septimius Cassianus, standard-bearer of the legion IIIIII Hispana, acting in the lustrum of chief centurion Publius Porcius Faustus, freely fulfilled his vow to the well-deserving [god]." Date: AD 244-8.

== Legion lists ==
It appears certain that no "VI Hispana" existed during the reign of Septimius Severus (r. 193–211). Two lists of the legions in being survive from this era, one inscribed on a column found in Rome (CIL VI, 3492) and the other a list of legions in existence "today" provided by the contemporary Greco-Roman historian Dio Cassius, writing ca. 210-232. Both these lists date from after 197, as both include the 3 Parthica legions founded by Severus in that year. Both lists provide an identical list of 33 legions. Therefore, if a VI Hispana ever did exist, it must have been either before or after Severus' reign.

== Theories ==
=== Mistaken identity ===
Theodor Mommsen, the 19th century German classicist, argued that the "IIIIII Hispana" of the Cassianus inscription was a misspelling of IX Hispana. This legion was sometimes written "VIIII Hispana". The mason may have mistakenly engraved "II" instead of "V". But there was (in 2015) no other evidence of the existence of IX Hispana later than 120. Sauveur argued (in 1918) that the tile-stamps of VI Hispana were in reality a mistake for VII Gemina, which from AD 70 till the 4th century was the sole imperial legion permanently based in Hispania. Sauveur also attributed the Brescia inscription to the VI Victrix, which was in Hispania for about a century (29 BC – AD 70) and may have acquired the "Hispana" title from this time. But there is no supporting evidence that VI Victrix was ever known by this name.

=== Early VI Hispana (1st/2nd centuries) ===
According to Seyrig (1923), the evidence is sufficient to prove that VI Hispana existed. Seyrig argues that VI Hispana was levied in present-day Northern Spain by the general Servius Sulpicius Galba in AD 68 to participate in his coup d'état against the emperor Nero. Seyrig cites Suetonius that Galba "raised from the people of his province (Hispania Tarraconensis) legions and auxiliary regiments additional to his existing forces of one legion [VI Victrix] and [5 auxiliary regiments]". But Dio Cassius records that Galba founded only VII Gemina and the I Adiutrix. Seyrig suggests that VI Hispana (or at least a detachment of it) was deployed in Dacia sometime in the period 70-150. Finally, Seyrig argues, VI Hispana disappeared during the 2nd century, before 197.

However, Seyrig's theory relied on dating of the source inscriptions which are not favoured today. Seyrig dates the Dinippus inscription to ca. 150, much later than the period 54–68 given in Epigraphik Datenbank. Also Seyrig considers the Cassianus inscription to date from before 197. This is unlikely, as Cassianus' first names, Lucius Septimius, show that he (or his forebears) acquired Roman citizenship under the emperor Septimius Severus (or one of his successors) i.e. in 193 at the earliest. Furthermore, the Cassianus inscription has been dated to the reign of Philip the Arab (r. 244–9) on stylistic and content grounds. The other main objection to Seyrig's thesis is that no further records of "VI Hispana" have been found since 1923, despite almost a century of intensive archaeological excavation of Roman military sites across Europe and the discovery of tens of thousands of Roman inscriptions. This seems implausible for an imperial legion active in the 1st and 2nd centuries.

=== Late VI Hispana (3rd century) ===
The dating of Cassianus to the reign of emperor Philip the Arab (244–9) has given rise to the theory that a legion VI Hispana was founded under the Severan dynasty (193–235), or even later, and was destroyed during the Empire's Third Century Crisis, possibly at the Battle of Abrittus (251), where an entire Roman army was annihilated. The epithet "Hispana" probably indicates that the legion's initial recruits were Spaniards.

The main difficulty with this theory is that Dio Cassius does not include a "VI Hispana" in his list of legions existing at his time of writing (210-235). If VI Hispana was founded after Dio completed his history (or after he died) the omission would be explained. In this case, VI Hispana may have been raised during the reigns of Alexander Severus (r. 222-35), Maximinus I (r. 235-8) or even Philip himself.

The lack of other evidence is not necessarily fatal to its plausibility, as the 3rd century saw a huge diminution in the frequency of inscriptions compared to the two preceding centuries. Furthermore, if the legion was founded around in the period 230-44 and destroyed in 251, its existence lasted only a decade or two, explaining the lack of more evidence.

=== Conclusion ===
The existence of a legion called "VI Hispana" remains doubtful. Seyrig's thesis appears unsustainable due to lack of sufficient evidence. A third century VI Hispana, however, is a possibility, though dependent on a single record (and its dating).

== See also ==
- List of Roman legions

== Sources ==
- https://www.livius.org/le-lh/legio/vi_hispana.html
