= Legio II Flavia Constantia =

Roman legion

Shield pattern of the Secunda Flavia Constantia Thebaeorum, according to Notitia Dignitatum.

The Legio II Flavia Constantia (reliable Flavian legion) was a comitatensis Roman legion, created by Diocletian or Galerius, probably in the years 293, 296 or 297.

Since Roman strategy at the time required each province to have two legions, and the Thebaid province had none, the II Flavia Constantia was formed together with I Maximiana to garrison the newly created province Thebaid which became part of the new diocese of Aegyptus.

Possibly in 293, a new military camp was built around the Amun temple in Luxor to be the base of the legion. Until the time of the Notitia Dignitatum the legion was stationed in Cusae. The Thebaid province faced south against the enemies the Romans, such as the Nubians, Kush, Meroe and Axum. The name of the legion is related to Constantius Chlorus, who was one of the four emperors at the time of the tetrarchs.

Over the course of time, probably under Constantine I, when the troops of the Egyptian provinces were united under the command of a dux (CIL II 12073), the legionary troops of the province were increased with units from both legions of Aegyptus I Iovia, II Traiana, and III Diocletiana, the latter gradually being divided into three garrisons (Not. or. XXXI 31. 33. 38). The legion, which was named after Constantine, received large sums of money in the form of Donatives from the emperor. One depiction of them on a wall in a legionary fortress showcases the officers of this legion with expensive tunics.

II Flavia Constantia Thebaeorum, which belonged, at the time of the Notitia, to the comitatus of the magister militum per Orientem (Not. or. VII 10 = 45), was certainly a split off from II Flavia Constantia, which was, for more than a century, an established border-legion. The impulse for this split was probably given by a measure of Theodosius I, to mix a part of the Barbarians, which were passed over to him, with the troops in Egypt. These barbarians were added to the Egyptian troops and their accompanying commander in Macedonia (Zosimus IV 30 and 31), who resided at that time in Thessalonica. A part of II Flavia Constantia belonged to these Aiguptioi (Egyptians). It is fitting that at this time the legion II Flavia Valentis Thebaeorum (Not or. VII 11 = 46), which accompanied the troops in the Notitia and was named after and probably raised by Emperor Valens, was no longer mentioned with the garrison of Thebaidos (Not. or. XXXI), because of the short time it stayed in the province.

== Attested members ==
Name	Rank	Time Frame	Province	Source
Aurelius or Flavius	Tribunus, Praefectus, Praepositus, or Centurio.	Around 300 CE	Aegyptus	

== See also ==
- List of Roman legions
