= Singara =

Ancient Roman fortification in northern Mesopotamia

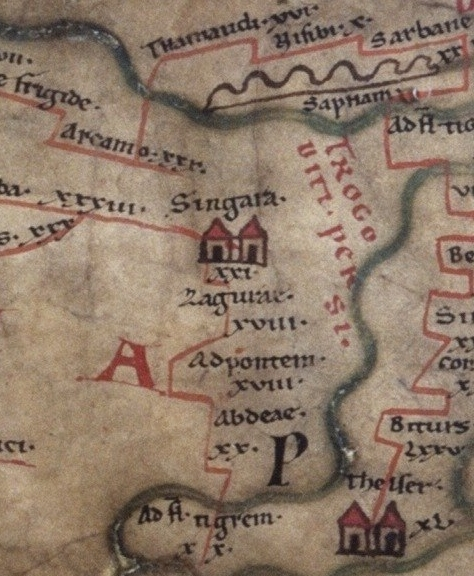
Singara in a detail from Peutinger's map, a medieval copy of a 4th-century Roman original.

Singara (Ancient Greek: τὰ Σίγγαρα, tà Síngara; Syriac: ܫܝܓܪ) was a strongly fortified post at the northern extremity of Mesopotamia, which for a while, as it appears from coins minted there, was occupied by the Romans as an advanced colony against the Persians. It was the camp of legio I Parthica.

== Location ==
Its position south-east of Nisibis was indifferently defined by ancient writers, with Stephanus of Byzantium calling it a city of Arabia "near Edessa" and Ptolemy placing it on the Tigris. There is no doubt, however, that it and its adjacent mountain (ὸ Σίγγαρας ὄρος, ò Síngaras óros) were the predecessors of the modern Sinjar and Mount Sinjar in modern Iraq's Nineveh Plains.

== History ==
It was first taken by the Romans during Trajan's eastern campaigns, when general Lusius Quietus captured the city without a fight in the winter of 114. Although it was abandoned following the Roman withdrawal from Mesopotamia in 117, the city became once again part of the Roman Empire with the Parthian campaign of Septimius Severus in 197. The city was raised by Severus to the status of a Roman colony, as is attested by the legend found on some of the coins minted there during the reign of Gordian III: ΑΥΡ. ϹΕΠ. ΚΟΛ. ϹΙΝΓΑΡΑ., which is Greek script for the city's Latin name, Aurelia Septimia Colonia Singara. It remained one of the easternmost outposts of the Roman Empire throughout the 3rd century. It was the scene of a celebrated nocturnal conflict during a siege of the city in 344 by Sassanid King Shapur II, the result of which was so unsatisfactory that both sides claimed the victory. Still later, in 359/360, during the reign of Constantius II, it is recorded that it underwent a celebrated siege, and at length was carried by the Persians by storm, though gallantly defended by the townspeople and two legions. The country around it is stated by Ammianus Marcellinus and Theophylact Simocatta to have been extremely arid, which rendered it equally difficult to take or to relieve from a distance. The city was destroyed in 578, during the Byzantine-Sasanian War of 572–591.
