= Zabdicene =

Zabdicene (Armenian: Ծաւդէք or Զաւդէք, romanized: Tsawdēk' or Zawdēk'; Greek: Ζαβδικηνή, romanized: Zavdikene; Latin: Zabdiccena; Classical Syriac: Zawdai) was a Carduchian principality in Anatolia, in today's Turkey. It was located west of Ake, southwest of Anjewaci and north of Adiabene.

Bezabde and Phinika (Pinaka, Finik, Φοινίκη in Greek) were located in Zabdicene. In 363, Zabdicene and its cities and fortresses were ceded to the Sasanian Empire. The principality declined by the mid-fifth century. Saint Babai the Great was born in the village of Beth Ainata in the region in 551.
