= Legio I Parthica =

Roman legion

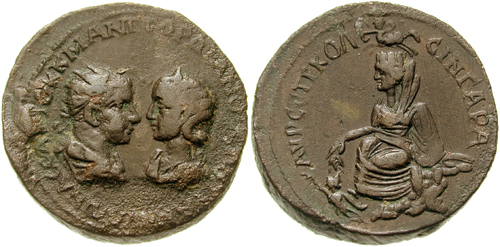
I Parthica symbol was the centaur, represented in the reverse of this coin struck in Singara under Emperor Gordian III.

Legio I Parthica (Latin for "1st Parthian Legion") was a legion of the Imperial Roman army founded in AD 197 by the emperor Septimius Severus (r. 193–211) for his forthcoming war against Parthia. The legion's presence in the Middle East is recorded until the early 5th century.

The legions I, II, and III Parthica were levied by Septimius Severus for his campaign against the Parthian Empire. After the success of this campaign, with Septimus Severus capturing Mesopotamia (modern day Iraq), I and III Parthica remained in the region, in the camp of Singara (Sinjar, Iraq), in Mesopotamia, to prevent subsequent rebellions and to guard the eastern provinces from attacks from the Parthian Empire. II Parthica was transferred to the Alban mountain near Rome, where it served as Rome's strategic reserve.

It is likely the first Parthica took part in expeditions in the third century, including expedition led by Severus's son, the emperor Caracalla, and the war waged by Severus Alexander against the Sasanian Persian empire.

Legionaries from I Parthica were usually sent to other provinces, namely Lycia and Cyrenaica.

In 360, I Parthica unsuccessfully defended its camp against a Sasanid attack; after the defeat, the legion was moved to Nisibis (modern Turkey), where it remained until the city was surrendered by emperor Jovian to the Sassanid Persians in 363. After that, the legion was moved to Constantina, where it is last mentioned in the 5th century.

The legion emblem was the centaur.

== See also ==
- List of Roman legions
- Roman legion
