= Legio I Macriana liberatrix =

Roman legion

Legio I Macriana liberatrix (Latin for "First legion Macriana liberatrix"; Macriana is a reference to its founder, Macer) was a Roman legion levied in Africa by the governor Lucius Clodius Macer in 68.

The purpose of the legion was to join forces with Legio III Augusta in support of the rebellion of Galba (governor of Hispania Terraconensis) against Emperor Nero. Nero eventually committed suicide and was replaced by Galba. But the new emperor looked at Macer with mistrust, fearing another rebellion against himself. Macer was killed in 69, the Year of the Four Emperors, and I Macriana liberatrix was disbanded. The emblem of the legion is unknown.

== See also ==
- List of Roman legions
