= Szőny =

Former town in Hungary

Szőny Szőny
- Location in Hungary
- Coordinates: 47°44′0″N 18°10′0″E
- Country: Hungary
- Elevation: 377 ft (115 m)

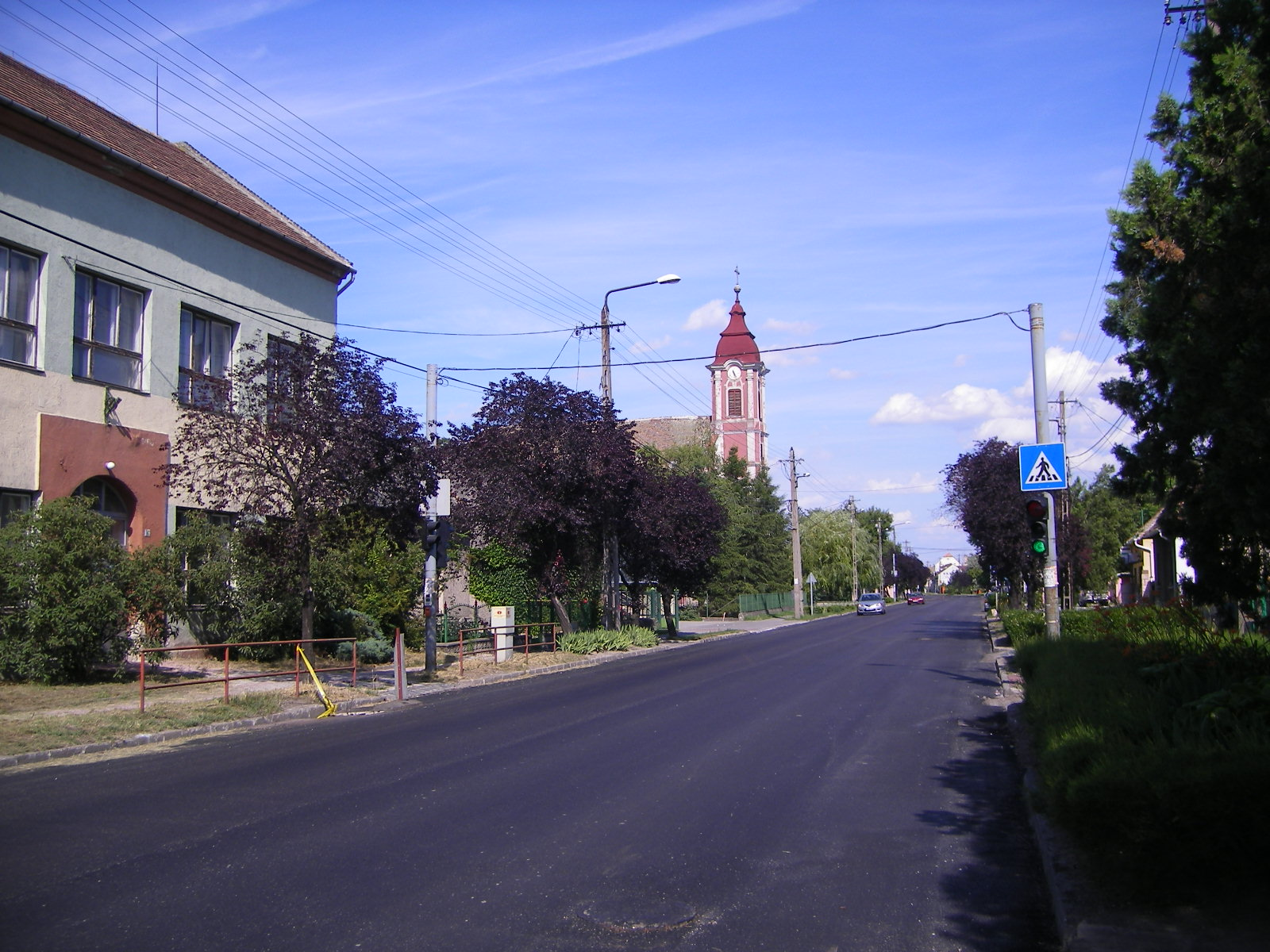
South Komárom/Szőny

Szőny was a port town in Hungary on the south side of the Danube River. Since 1977, it has been absorbed as part of the city of Komárom.

== History ==
The Roman legion Legio I Adiutrix was based in Szőny from 86 AD to the mid-5th century and took part in several Parthian wars.

The town has had many different names at different times. The town was known as Brigetio to the Romans, and was the site of the death of Roman Emperor Valentinian I in 375 AD. An important Roman military diploma was found in the town in the early twentieth century, and it is now in the collection of the British Museum. During the Middle Ages, the town was called Camarum. The town has one of the earliest records of conjoined twins: Helen and Judith.

The town's name was first mentioned in a charter in 1211 as Sun. In 1249, it was named Sceun, mentioned for being the village of the Archbishop of Esztergom. King Béla IV traded the town for another village. In 1269 it was mentioned as terra Sceun, in 1397 as possessio Zyun, and in 1422 as villa Zwn, a Komárom castle estate. By 1460, it was oppidum Zwny; a town whose customs and income belonged to the Komárom castle.

It was destroyed by the Ottomans in 1592. On 12 September 1627, Emperor Ferdinand II and the Turkish Sultan made the Peace of Szőny here. The peace document was issued in three languages: Hungarian, Latin, and Turkish, and reaffirmed the 1606 Zsitvatorok, 1615 Vienna, 1618 Komárom, and 1625 colonial treaties.

During the 1848-49 revolution and war of independence, several major battles took place within the boundaries of the village. At the beginning of the 20th century, several pieces of cannonballs fired during the siege of Komárom were still visible in the wall of the Catholic church.

During the oil campaign of World War II, the Szőny oil refinery was a strategic bombing target by the Allies.
