= Lucius Clodius Macer =

1st-century Roman politician and soldier

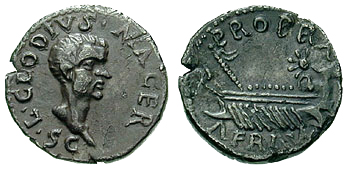
Clodius Macer portrait on one of his denarii.

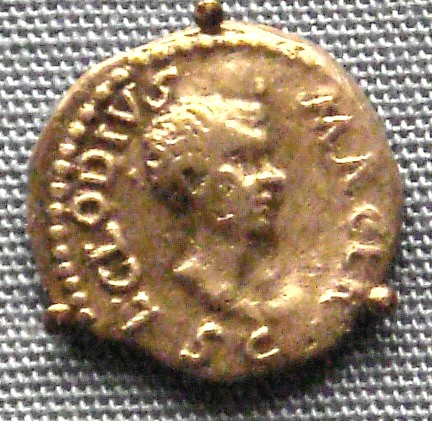
Silver denarius of Clodius Macer, 68 AD. British Museum.

Lucius Clodius Macer was a legatus of the Roman Empire in Africa during the reign of Nero. He revolted in May 68, cutting off the food supply of Rome, possibly at the instigation of Calvia Crispinilla. Although encouraged by Galba, Macer raised a legion Legio I Macriana liberatrix in addition to the Legio III Augusta that he already commanded, presumably raising suspicion that Macer also harbored imperial ambitions. In October 68, Galba had him killed by the procurator Trebonius Garutianus. Papirus, the centurion of Mucianus, was implicated in his assassination.

A mint was operated by Macer in either Cirta or Carthage. This mint was of small size and there is no record of any gold coinage being produced. Numismatists C. H. V. Sutherland and Robert Carson noted that Macer's coinage varied in quality and featured errors such as missing letters or the letter S being reversed. His coins have been found in Tunisia and Spain.

== Sources ==
- Plutarch, Galba 6,1f.
- Tacitus, Histories 1,37,3; 1,7,1; 2,97,2; 4,49,4.

== Works cited ==
- Sutherland, C.; Carson, R., eds. (1984). The Roman Imperial Coinage: From 31 BC to AD 69. Vol. 1. Spink & Son. ISBN 0907605095.
