= Legio I Adiutrix =

Roman legion

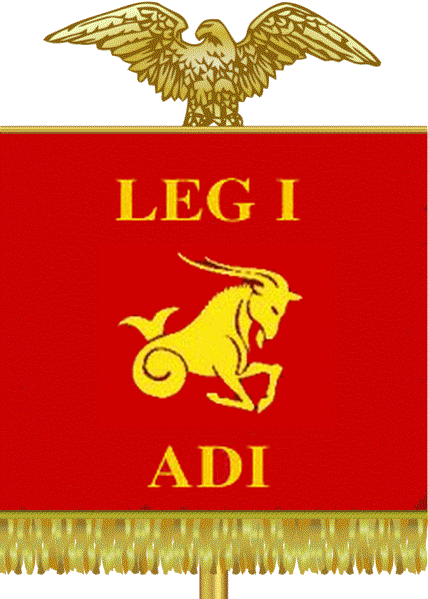
- Vexillum of the Legion
- Active: 68 – 344
- Country: Roman Empire
- Branch: Imperial Roman army
- Garrison/HQ: Brigetio
- Engagements: Year of the Four Emperors: Battle of Bedriacum; Revolt of the Batavi; Trajan's Dacian Wars; Marcomannic Wars; Trajan's Parthian campaign Battle of Mediolanum

Map of the Roman Empire in AD 125, under emperor Hadrian, showing the Legio I Adiutrix, stationed on the river Danube at Brigetio (Szőny, Hungary), in Pannonia Superior province, from AD 86 to at least 344

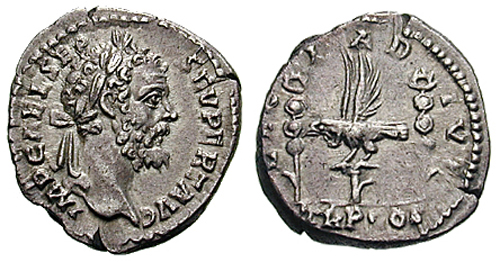
I Adiutrix celebrated by Septimius Severus with this denarius. I Adiutrix supported Severus in his fight for the purple.

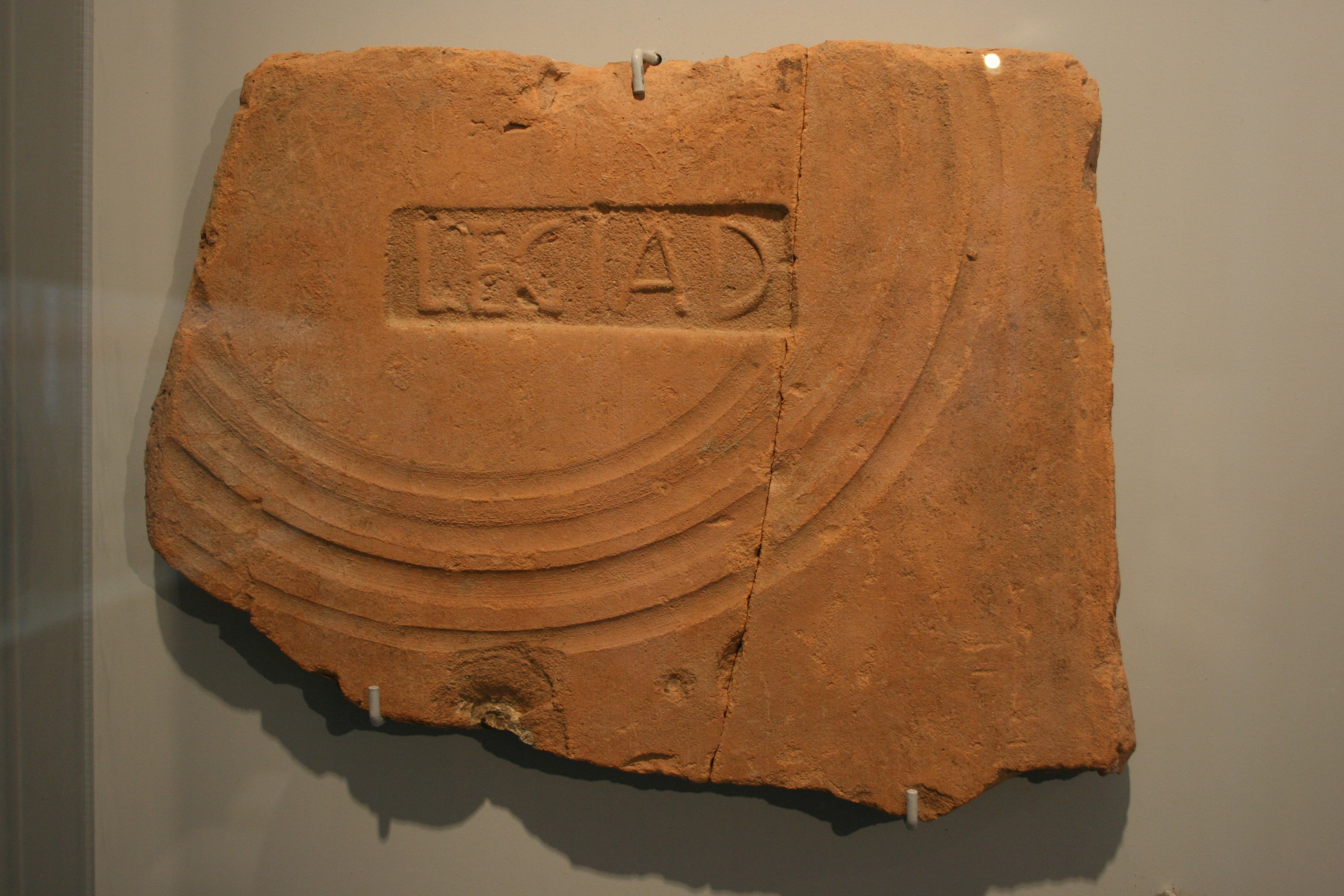
Brick stamp LEG I AD found in Rheinzabern.

Legio I Adiutrix (lit. First Legion "Rescuer"), was a legion of the Imperial Roman army founded in AD 68, probably by Nero or Galba when he rebelled against emperor Nero (r. 54–68). The last record mentioning the Adiutrix is in 344, when it was stationed at Brigetio (modern Szőny), in the Roman province of Pannonia. The emblem of the legion was a capricorn, used along with the winged horse Pegasus, on the helmets the symbol used by I Adiutrix legionaries was a dolphin.

== Origins ==
Graham Webster notes that, along with its partner Legio II Adiutrix, that while both were raised from marines of the Fleet, "their precise origins are obscured by the confusion of the Civil War." Tacitus mentions that marines Nero had brought into Rome were still present in the city when Galba arrived from Spain; both Suetonius and Dio Cassius state that Galba created the legion. H.M.D. Parker argues that the dies natalis, or official date of creation when it received its aquila standard, of the legion was 22 December 68.

== Year of the Four Emperors ==
In the confusing Year of the Four Emperors, the legion fought in Otho's army in the Battle of Bedriacum, where this emperor was defeated by Vitellius The victorious Vitellius ordered the legion transferred to Spain, but by the year 70 it was fighting in the Batavian rebellion.

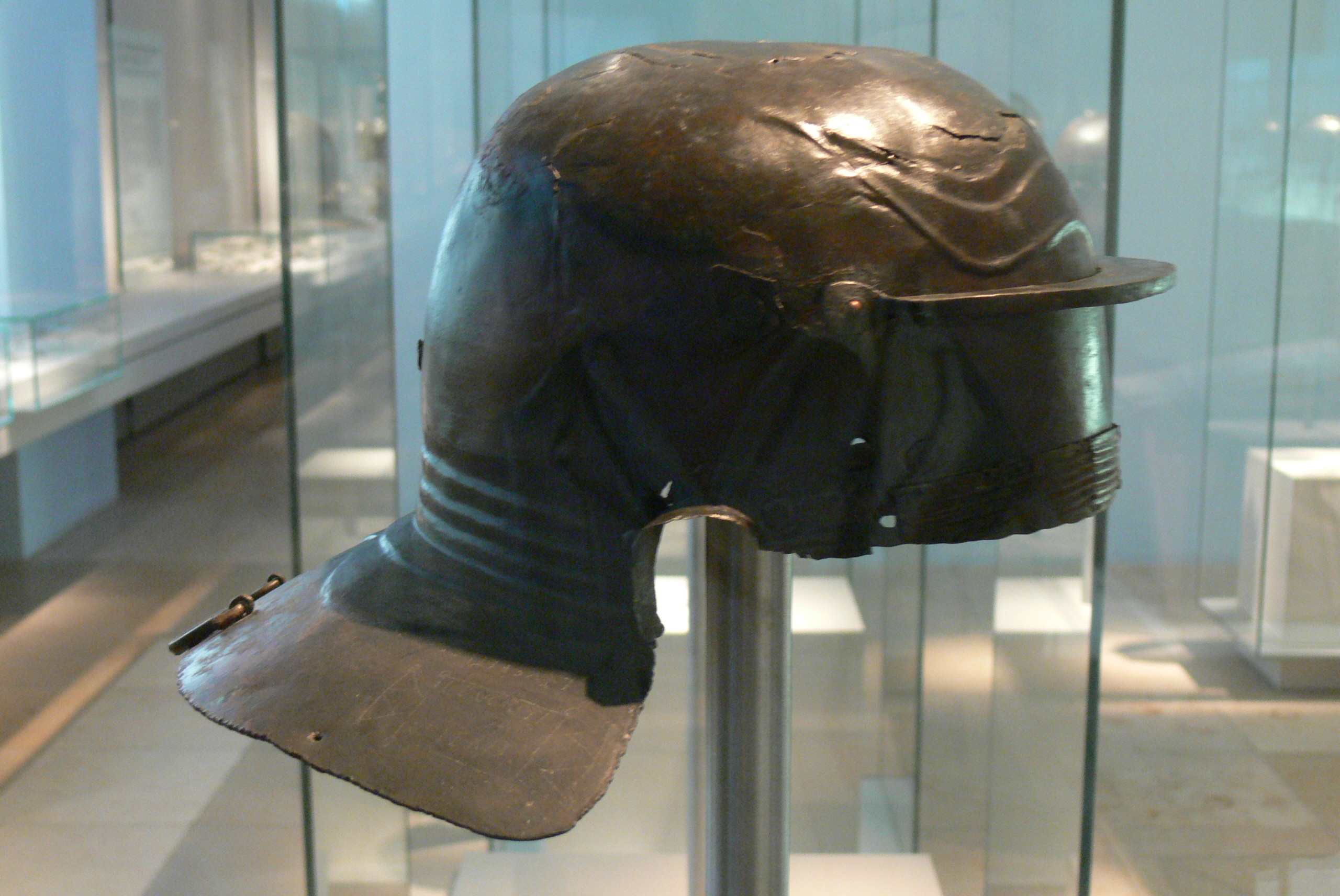
Helmet of Lucius Lucretius Celer, Soldier in the centuria of Gaius Mummius Lolianus of the Legio I Adiutrix

== Stationed in Moguntiacum ==
The city of Moguntiacum (Mainz) is the legion's first known base camp, shared with Legio XIV Gemina, where they attended mainly building activities. In 83, they fought the Germanic wars against the Chatti, a German tribe living across the Rhine, under the command of Emperor Domitian. After that they were transferred to the Danubian army stationed in the Roman province of Pannonia, to fight the Dacians.

== Legio I Adiutrix Pia Fidelis ==
Following the murder of Domitian in 96, the Adiutrix, along with the Danubian army, played an important role in Roman politics, forcing Nerva to adopt Trajan as his successor. When Trajan became emperor, he gave the legion the cognomen Pia Fidelis ("loyal and faithful") to acknowledge their support. Between 101 and 106, under the new emperor's command, I Adiutrix, along with IV Flavia Felix and XIII Gemina, conquered Dacia and occupied the newly formed province. Trajan also used his Pia Fidelis in the campaign against Parthia (115–117), but they were sent back to Pannonia by his successor emperor Hadrian, with base in Brigetio.

During the next decades, I Adiutrix remained in the Danube frontier. Under Marcus Aurelius, I Adiutrix fought the war against Marcomanni commanded by Marcus Valerius Maximianus. Between 171 and 175, the commander was Pertinax, emperor for a brief period in 193. When Septimius Severus became emperor, I Adiutrix was among his supporters, joining him in the march for Rome.

In the next decades, the main base was again Pannonia, but they played a part in several Parthian wars, namely the campaigns of 195 and 197–198 of Septimius Severus, 215–217 led by Caracalla and 244 by Gordian III.

The legion, or more likely vexilationes of it, took part in the battle of Mediolanum.

The legion received the cognomen Pia Fidelis Bis ("twice loyal and faithful") and Constans ("reliable"), sometime in the 3rd century.

== Attested members ==
Name	Rank	Time frame	Province	Source
Orfidius Benignus	legatus legionis	69	Italia	Tacitus, Histories, ii.43
Sextus Octavius Fronto	legatus legionis	between 75 and 85		
Titus Julius Maximus Manlianus	legatus legionis	c. 105		CIL XII, 3167
Lucius Attius Macro	legatus legionis	between 125 and 130	Pannonia Superior	CIL III, 4356
Claudius Maximus	legatus legionis	c. 134 - c. 137	Pannonia Superior	
Titus Flavius Longinus	legatus legionis	c. 143-c. 146	Pannonia Superior	IGRR I, 622
Gaius Julius Commodus Orfitianus	legatus legionis	c. 149-c. 152	Pannonia Superior	
Publius Helvius Pertinax	legatus legionis	c. 171-175	Pannonia Superior	Augustan History, Pertinax, 2.6
Marcus Valerius Maximianus	legatus legionis	c. 179	Pannonia Superior	AE 1956, 124
Lucius Aurelius Gallus	legatus legionis	c. 193	Pannonia Superior	
Gaius Junius Faustinus Placidus Postumianus	legatus legionis	c. 196?	Pannonia Superior	CIL VIII, 597
Quintus Cornelius Valens Cu[...] Honestianus Junianus	legatus legionis	200/210	Pannonia Superior	CIL VIII, 18269
Claudius Piso	legatus legionis	c. 207	Pannonia Superior	
Lucius Julius Apronius Maenius Pius Salamallianus	legatus legionis	220/222	Pannonia Superior	CIL VIII, 18270
Aemillus Deciminus	medicus ordinarius	c.114	Pannonia	CIL III, 4279
Quintus T.f. Attius Priscus	tribunus angusticlavius	1st century		CIL V, 7425 = ILS 2720
Lucius Minicius Natalis Quadronius Verus	tribunus laticlavius	c. 115		CIL XIV, 3599
Gaius Caesonius Macer Rufinianus	tribunus laticlavius	between 178 and 180	Pannonia Superior	CIL XIV, 3900
Gaius Julius Septimius Castinus	tribunus laticlavius	late 2nd century	Pannonia Superior	CIL III, 10473

== See also ==
- List of Roman legions
