= Pseudocomitatenses =

Pseudocomitatenses were a class of regiment in the Late Roman army. Although they were attached to the comitatus (higher-grade mobile armies), they enjoyed lower status and pay to the comitatenses, the regular regiments of the comitatus. This is because their regiments had originally been classified as lower-grade limitanei ("border troops"), but at some point attached to a comitatus for a particular campaign and subsequently retained long-term. There is indication that at least some of the pseudocomitatenses were former auxiliary cohorts.

== See also ==
- Late Roman army
- Notitia Dignitatum
