= Javolena gens =

Ancient Roman family

The gens Javolena, occasionally found as Javolenia, was a minor plebeian family at ancient Rome. Few members of this gens appear in history, but two of them attained the consulship, one under Domitian, and the other in the time of Antoninus Pius.

== Origin ==
The nomen Javolenus belongs to a class of gentilicia formed using the suffix -enus, typically of Umbrian and Picentine origin. Based on a number of inscriptions from Iguvium in Umbria, historian Anthony Birley concludes that the various names of Lucius Javolenus Priscus point to this as the likely origin of the family.

== Praenomina ==
The main praenomina of the Javoleni were Gaius, Lucius, and Marcus, the three most common names in all periods of Roman history. The only other praenomen found in inscriptions of this family is Sextus.

== Members ==
This list includes abbreviated praenomina. For an explanation of this practice, see filiation.

- Gaius Octavius Tidius Tossianus Lucius Javolenus Priscus, legate of the Legio III Augusta and Legio IV Flavia Felix, and consul suffectus in AD 86. He subsequently served as governor of Germania Superior, Syria, and Africa Proconsularis, but is perhaps best remembered for his legal opinions.
- Gaius Javolenus Chrysomalus, named in an inscription from Iguvium in Umbria, dating to the late first or early second century.
- Lucius Javolenus Phoebus, a freedman, and one of the calatores of the pontifices and flamines mentioned in inscriptions from Rome, dating to AD 101 and 102. He may be the same Lucius Javolenus Phoebus buried at Rome, with a monument from his wife, Licinia Cynegis.
- Gaius Javolenus Calvinus Geminius Capito Cornelius Pollio Squilla Quintus Vulcacius Scuppidius Verus, after serving as quaestor, tribune of the plebs, and praetor, was appointed governor of Lusitania and Hispania Baetica. He was consul suffectus early in the reign of Antoninus Pius.
- Lucius Javolenus Anthimus, buried at Rome during the second or third century, with a monument from his son, Anthus.
- Lucius Javolenus Apulus, named in two second-century inscriptions from Iguvium, apparently recording offerings made to Mars.
- Javolena Cypris, buried at Saepinum in Samnium, aged eighteen years, six months, and twelve days, with a second-century monument from Marcus Hostilius.
- Gaius Javolenus Severus, dedicated a second-century monument at Verona in Venetia and Histria to his wife, Annia Aquilina, aged thirty-nine years, eleven months, and sixteen days.
- Gaius Javolenus Saturnalis, a standard bearer for the Legio II Augusta, together with the freedman Lucius Manius, made an offering to Sulis at Aquae Sulis in Britannia, recorded in an inscription dating between the late first and the end of the third century.
- Gaius Javolenus Modestus, a centurion in the Legio XIII Gemina, made an offering to Mercury at the present site of Varhely, formerly part of Dacia, during the second century, or the first half of the third.
- Javolena Dio[...], dedicated a monument at Rome to her brother, Lucius Mai[...] Chrestus, dating to the latter half of the third century.

=== Undated Javoleni ===
- Marcus Javolenus, named on a pot found at Arretium in Etruria.
- Javolena Artemisia, buried at Tusculum in Latium, with a monument fromher husband, Epictetus.
- Lucius Javolenus Hilarus, buried at Rome, with a monument from his son, Sulpicianus.
- Javolena Marcia, together with her sister and mother, both named Javolena Sosibia, dedicated a monument at Rome to her father, Publius Manlius Fuscus.
- Javolena Primilla, buried at Rome, aged eighteen years, four months, and twenty days, with a monument dedicated by her husband, Marcus Claudius Julianus.
- Javolena Sabina, a freedwoman buried at Rome, aged twenty-two, with a monument from Lucius Javolenus Restitutus, probably her former master.
- Javolena Sosibia, the mother of Javolena Marcia and Javolena Sosibia, with whom she joined in dedicating a monument at Rome to her husband, Publius Manlius Fuscus.
- Javolena Sosibia, together with her mother, also named Javolena Sosibia, and sister, Javolena Marcia, dedicated a monument at Rome to her father, Publius Manlius Fuscus.
- Javolena Thyce, a freedwoman buried at Rome, aged thirty, with a monument from Narcissus, who had been a slave with her.
- Javolenia Sextulla Ufclia, buried in the sepulchre of the Javolenii at Thibilis in Numidia, aged twenty-one.
- Marcus Javolenius M. f. Victor Asinus Major, buried in the sepulchre of the Javolenii at Thibilis, aged thirteen.
- Sextus Javolenius Sex. f. Victor Junior, buried in the sepulchre of the Javolenii at Thibilis, aged nineteen.

== See also ==
- List of Roman gentes

== Bibliography ==
- Theodor Mommsen et alii, Corpus Inscriptionum Latinarum (The Body of Latin Inscriptions, abbreviated CIL), Berlin-Brandenburgische Akademie der Wissenschaften (1853–present).
- René Cagnat et alii, L'Année épigraphique (The Year in Epigraphy, abbreviated AE), Presses Universitaires de France (1888–present).
- Paul von Rohden, Elimar Klebs, & Hermann Dessau, Prosopographia Imperii Romani (The Prosopography of the Roman Empire, abbreviated PIR), Berlin (1898).
- Antonio Ferrua, Antiche Inscrizione Inedite di Roma (Unedited Ancient Inscriptions from Rome), (1939–1980).
- Géza Alföldy, Konsulat und Senatorenstand unter der Antonien (The Consulate and Senatorial State under the Antonines), Rudolf Habelt, Bonn (1977).
- Anthony R. Birley, The Fasti of Roman Britain, Clarendon Press (1981).
- Paul A. Gallivan, "The Fasti for A.D. 70–96", in Classical Quarterly, vol. 31, pp. 186–220 (1981).
