= Tettiena gens =

Ancient Roman family

The gens Tettiena was a minor plebeian family at ancient Rome. Members of this gens first appear in history in the time of Vespasian, from which they rose to hold the highest offices of the Roman state, but in the second century they once again faded into obscurity.

== Origin ==
The nomen Tettienus belongs to a class of gentilicia formed from other names using the suffix -enus, a variation of the common derivative suffix -inus, but occurring with stems ending in -i. Most gentilicia of this sort are formed from other nomina, rather than places of origin. Tettienus appears to be an elaboration of Tettius or Tetteius, perhaps originally derived from teta, a dove, and likely of Oscan origin. Chase records the variation Tettienius among those gentilicia which are apparently not Latin, but of Umbrian, Picentine, or Sabine origin. The Tettieni who rose to prominence under the Flavian emperors were from Asisium in Umbria.

== Praenomina ==
The chief praenomina of the Tettieni were Titus, Gaius, and the novel Galeo, not known to have been used by any other gentes, and apparently a tradition unique to this family. One explanation suggested is that the consul Tettienus Petronianus and those who followed him derived it from the surname of his mother, Petronia Galeonis. Some of the Tettieni bore other common names, including Lucius, Marcus, and Quintus.

== Members ==
This list includes abbreviated praenomina. For an explanation of this practice, see filiation.

- Gaius Tettienus, the master of Surus, a slave mentioned in an inscription from Alba Fucens in Sabinum, dating from the first half of the first century BC.
- Titus Tettienus, the master of Dorotheus, a slave mentioned in an inscription from Alba Fucens, dating from the first half of the first century BC.
- Titus Tettienus, one of the quattuorviri of Asisium in Umbria, named in an inscription dating from the early first century.
- Titus Tettienus T. l. Antiochus, a freedman named in an inscription from Rome, dating from the first half of the first century, along with Tettiena Nice, Tettiena Paedrio, and Titus Tettienus Theophilus.
- Tettiena T. l. Nice, a freedwoman named in an inscription from Rome, dating from the first half of the first century, along with Titus Tettienus Antiochus, Tettiena Paedrio, and Titus Tettienus Theophilus.
- Tettiena T. l. Paedrio, a freedwoman named in an inscription from Rome, dating from the first half of the first century, along with Titus Tettienus Antiochus, Tettiena Nice, and Titus Tettienus Theophilus.
- Titus Tettienus T. f. Theophilus, named in an inscription from Rome, dating from the first half of the first century, along with Titus Tettienus Antiochus, Tettiena Paedrio, and Titus Tettienus Theophilus.
- Galeo Tettienus Pardalas, together with Tettiena Galene, built a tetrastyle and donated images of Castor and Pollux for the city of Asisium, dating between the accession of Tiberius and the death of Nero.
- Tettiena Galene, together with Galeo Tettienus Pardalas, donated a tetrastyle and images of Castor and Pollux for the city of Asisium, dating between the accession of Tiberius and the death of Nero.
- Gaius Tettienus Ɔ. l. Hedylus, a freedman named in a first-century inscription from Rome.
- Tettiena Phila, buried in a first-century tomb at Aquileia in Venetia and Histria.
- Gaius Tettienus Alexsa, the freedman of Sagitta, named in a middle first-century sepulchral inscription from Alba Fucens.
- Marcus Tettienus M. f. Pollio, commemorated in an inscription from Saguntum in Hispania Citerior, dating from the latter half of the first century, had been aedile, quaestor, a flamen of the imperial cult, and one of the duumvirs of Saguntum. His wife was Baebia Lepida.
- Galeo Tettienus Petronianus, consul in AD 76.
- Titus Tettienus Serenus, probably the brother of Galeo Tettienus Petronianus, was governor of Gallia Lugdunensis from AD 78 to 80, was consul suffectus in July and August of AD 81.
- Titus Tettienus Felix, a scribe and librarius, or secretary, for the curule aediles, and a viator for the plebeian aediles, bequeathed fifty thousand sestertii for the decoration of the temple of Pomona at Salernum in Campania, according to a late first-century inscription. Another inscription describing him as a priest of Commodus appears to be a forgery.
- Galeo Tettienus Eutychianus, a freedman buried at Rome, in a tomb dating between the middle of the first century, and the middle part of the second.
- Galeo Tettienus Modestus, a freedman buried at Rome, in a tomb dating between the middle of the first century, and the middle part of the second.
- Quintus Tettienus T. f. Macro, buried at the site of modern Ferentillo in Umbria, along with his wife, Appaea Secunda, in a first- or second-century tomb built by one or more of their children.
- Tettiena Severa, the wife of Apuleius Onesimus, with whom she built a first- or second-century tomb for one of their children.
- Galeo Tettienus Severus Marcus Eppuleius Proculus Tiberius Caepio Hispo, perhaps the adopted son of either Galeo Tettienus Petronianus or Titus Tettienus Serenus, was consul in an uncertain year between AD 101 and 103. He was the husband of Annia Quartilla, son-in-law of Appius Annius Marsus.
- Galeo Tettienus Serno Lucius Gavius Liccianus Marcus Eppuleius Proculus Tiberius Caepio Hispo, the son of Severus, according to an inscription from Ephesus.
- Gaius Tettienus C. l. Zmaragdus, a freedman named in an inscription from Rome, dating to AD 136.
- Titus Tettienus Alcimus, buried at Ocriculum in Umbria, in a second-century tomb built by his wife, Scantia Admete.
- Tettiena Capriola, the mother of Galeo Tettienus Feli[...] and Olympias. She and Titus Tettienus Maius, perhaps her husband, dedicated a second-century tomb at Portus for Capriola's son, while her daughter dedicated a second-century tomb at Ostia for Capriola.
- Tettiena Crispina, the wife of [...]cispius Felix, with whom she was buried in a second-century tomb at Alba Fucens, dedicated by one or more of their children.
- Tettiena Dextra, the wife of Fortunatus, for whom she built a second-century tomb at Rome, along with Fortunatus' colleague, Lucius Hermes.
- Galeo Tettienus Feli[...], a youth buried in a second-century tomb at Portus in Latium, aged fifteen years, [...] months, and twenty-one days, in a tomb built by Titus Tettienus Maius and Tettiena Capriola, the boy's mother.
- Tettiena Livilla, dedicated a second-century tomb at Rome for her freedman and nurse, Tettienus Perilemptus.
- Titus Tettienus Maius, together with Tettiena Capriola, dedicated a second-century tomb at Portus for Capriola's son, Galeo Tettienus Feli[...].
- Tettienus Perilemptus, a freedman and nurse, buried in a second-century sepulchre at Rome, dedicated by his former mistress, Tettiena Livilla.
- Lucius Tettienus Vitalis, a native of Aquileia, mentioned in a second-century verse inscribed at Augusta Taurinorum in Gallia Narbonensis.
- Tettiena Successa, buried at Asisium, in a second- or third-century tomb built by her husband, Tiberius Claudius Justinus.
- Tettienus Eutychianus, dedicated a third-century tomb at Rome for his stepson, Gelasius.
- Titus Tettienus Priscus, buried in a third-century tomb at Rome, dedicated by his wife, Domitia Pausilypus.
- Tettienus Proculus, one of the agents of the senator Gaius Sallius Aristaenes, appointed to care for his mid-third century grave at Rome.

=== Undated Tettieni ===
- Lucius Tettienus, buried at Aquileia.
- Tettiena Eucha, buried at Rome, in a tomb built by Virius Vitalis.
- Gaius Tettienus Ɔ. l. Pothus, a freedman named in an inscription from Rome.
- Tettienus Xenophon, buried at Rome, along with his wife, the freedwoman Casperia Passarina, with a monument from Casperia's patron.

== See also ==
- List of Roman gentes

== Bibliography ==
- Theodor Mommsen et alii, Corpus Inscriptionum Latinarum (The Body of Latin Inscriptions, abbreviated CIL), Berlin-Brandenburgische Akademie der Wissenschaften (1853–present).
- Notizie degli Scavi di Antichità (News of Excavations from Antiquity, abbreviated NSA), Accademia dei Lincei (1876–present).
- René Cagnat et alii, L'Année épigraphique (The Year in Epigraphy, abbreviated AE), Presses Universitaires de France (1888–present).
- George Davis Chase, "The Origin of Roman Praenomina", in Harvard Studies in Classical Philology, vol. VIII, pp. 103–184 (1897).
- Paul von Rohden, Elimar Klebs, & Hermann Dessau, Prosopographia Imperii Romani (The Prosopography of the Roman Empire, abbreviated PIR), Berlin (1898).
- Ronald Syme, Tacitus, Clarendon Press, Oxford (1958).
- Inschriften Griechischer Städte aus Kleinasien (Inscriptions from the Greek Cities of Asia Minor, abbreviated IK), Bonn (1973–present).
- Paul A. Gallivan, "The Fasti for A.D. 70–96", in Classical Quarterly, vol. 31, pp. 186–220 (1981).
- Werner Eck, "Jahres- und Provinzialfasten der senatorischen Statthalter von 69/70 bis 138/139" (Annual and Provincial Fasti of the Senatorial Governors from AD 69/70 to 138/139), in Chiron, vol. 12 (1982).
- Giovanni Battista Brusin, Inscriptiones Aquileiae (Inscriptions of Aquileia), Udine (1991–1993).
- Olli Salomies, Adoptive and Polyonymous Nomenclature in the Roman Empire, Societas Scientiarum Fennica, Helsinki (1992).
- Paola Germoni and Mireille Cébeillac-Gervasoni, "Tre epigrafi funerarie inedite dall’Isola Sacra" (Three Unpublished Funerary Epigraphs from Isola Sacra), in Ostia, l'Italia e il mediterraneo, Maria Letizia Caldelli et al., eds., Rome, pp. 211–217 (2021).
