= Tettia gens =

Ancient Roman family

The gens Tettia, sometimes written Tetteia, was a minor plebeian family at ancient Rome. Members of this gens are first mentioned toward the end of the Republic. They obtained senatorial rank, and flourished under the early emperors.

== Origin ==
The nomen Tettius or Tetteius seems to belong to one of the northern Italic languages, such as Umbrian or the language of the Sabines. At least some of the Tettii lived at Asisium in Umbria, perhaps the family's place of origin. Tettius, the regular Latin form, is cognate with the Oscan spelling Tetteius, and also appears as Tetis in Sabine inscriptions. The name may be derived from teta, a dove.

== Praenomina ==
The chief praenomina of the Tettii seem to have been Lucius, Aulus, Publius, and Gaius, each of which was common throughout Roman history. Inscriptions show that they also regularly used other common names, including Marcus, Sextus, and Titus.

== Members ==
This list includes abbreviated praenomina. For an explanation of this practice, see filiation.

- Publius Tettius, testified against Verres during his trial in 70 BC.
- Tettius Damio, sheltered Cicero at a time when he was pursued by the followers of Publius Clodius Pulcher.
- Gaius Tettius, the son of Petronia, was an infant disinherited by his father, but by a decree of Augustus, he nonetheless received his father's property. It seems possible that his nomen was in fact Tettienus, as the consul Galeo Tettienus Petronianus was evidently descended from the Petronia gens.
- Publius Tettius P. f. Rufus Tontianus, honored by a monument at Atina in Latium, dating to the Julio-Claudian period, had been quaestor, tribune of the plebs, and praetor.
- Lucius Tettius Julianus, commander of the Legio VII Claudia in Moesia, he and his colleagues defeated the Roxolani, and were awarded the consular dignity by the emperor Otho in AD 69. During the civil war that followed, Marcus Aponius Saturninus, the governor of Moesia, attempted his assassination. Julianus avoided taking sides in the conflict, although his soldiers declared for Vespasian. The senate prevented him from claiming the praetorship in AD 70, but he was thereafter granted it by Domitian. He was consul suffectus in 83.
- Gaius Tettius C. f. Africanus Cassianus Priscus, a native of Asisium, served as prefect of the vigiles, praefectus annonae, and governor of Egypt from AD 80 to 82.
- Tettia Materna, the wife of Lucius Julius Longinus, governor of (Sardinia and Corsica?), was buried at Aleria, in a Flavian-era tomb dedicated by her husband.
- Tettius Caballus, a buffoon mentioned by Martial.
- Lucius Tettius Nonius Rufus, a man of senatorial rank, was the husband of Caecilia, with whom he dedicated a third-century tomb at Rome for their young son, Lucius Tettius Nonius Caecilius Lysias.
- Lucius Tettius L. f. Nonius Caecilius Lysiae, the son of Lucius Tettius Nonius Rufus and Caecilia, was a little boy buried in a third-century tomb at Rome, aged two years, nine months, and ninteteen days.
- Tettius Facundus, consul in AD 336.

== See also ==
- List of Roman gentes

== Bibliography ==
- Marcus Tullius Cicero, Epistulae ad Atticum, In Verrem.
- Valerius Maximus, Factorum ac Dictorum Memorabilium (Memorable Facts and Sayings).
- Marcus Valerius Martialis (Martial), Epigrammata (Epigrams).
- Publius Cornelius Tacitus, Historiae.
- Dictionary of Greek and Roman Biography and Mythology, William Smith, ed., Little, Brown and Company, Boston (1849).
- Theodor Mommsen et alii, Corpus Inscriptionum Latinarum (The Body of Latin Inscriptions, abbreviated CIL), Berlin-Brandenburgische Akademie der Wissenschaften (1853–present).
- Paul von Rohden, Elimar Klebs, & Hermann Dessau, Prosopographia Imperii Romani (The Prosopography of the Roman Empire, abbreviated PIR), Berlin (1898).
- Paul A. Gallivan, "The Fasti for A.D. 70–96", in Classical Quarterly, vol. 31, pp. 186–220 (1981).
