= Tiberius Claudius Maximus =

Late 1st/early 2nd century Roman cavalryman

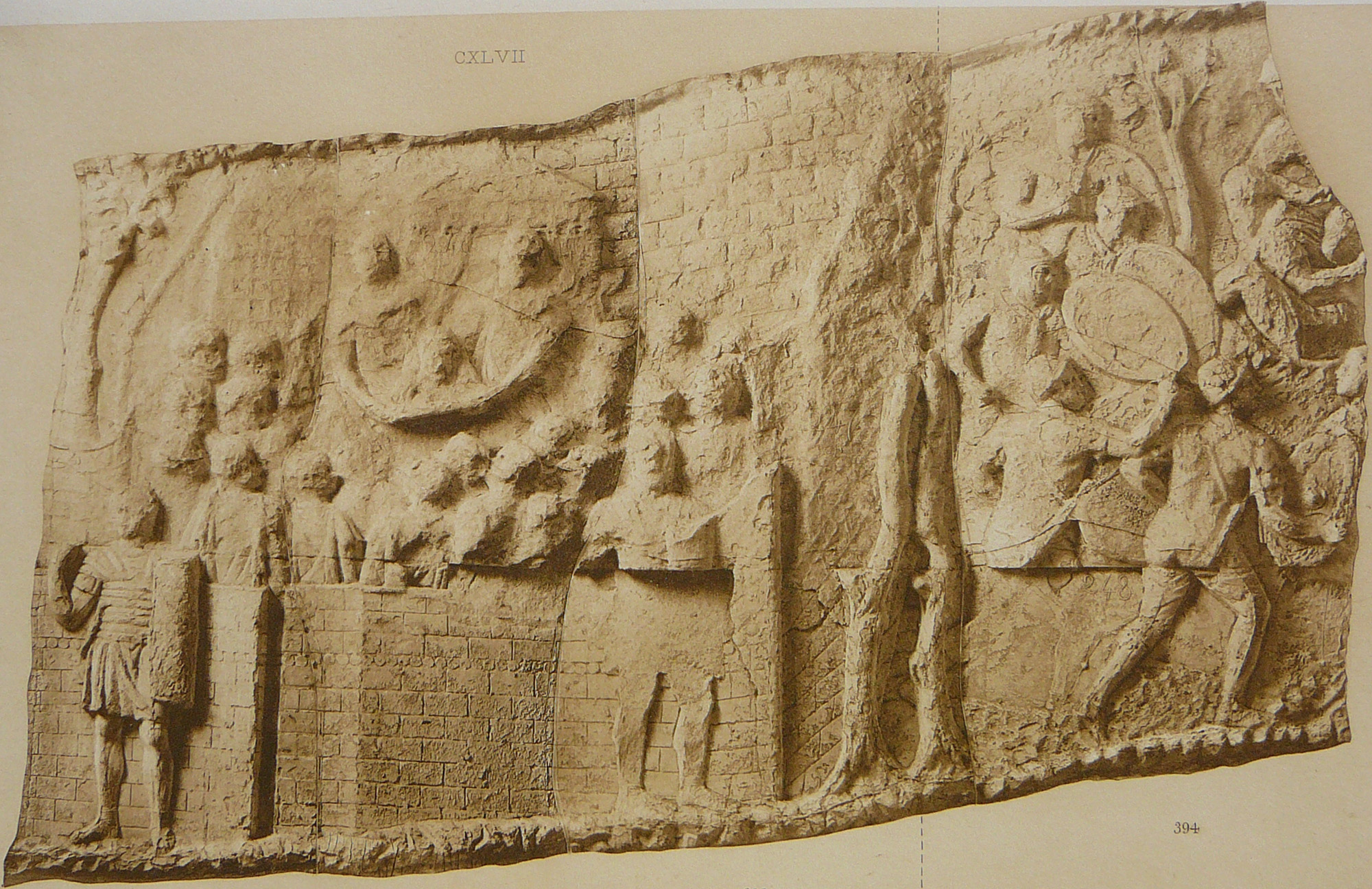
Plaster cast (Cichorius 108) of panel on Trajan's Column. The head of the defeated Dacian king Decebalus (left background) is displayed on a shield to Roman troops (AD 106). The head was then taken to Rome to form the central exhibit in the emperor Trajan's official Triumph

Tiberius Claudius Maximus (died after AD 117) was a cavalryman in the Imperial Roman army who served in the Roman legions and Auxilia under the emperors Domitian and Trajan in the period AD 85–117. He is noted for presenting Trajan with the head of Dacian king Decebalus, who had committed suicide after being surrounded by Roman cavalry at the end of Dacian Wars (AD 106).

== Sources ==
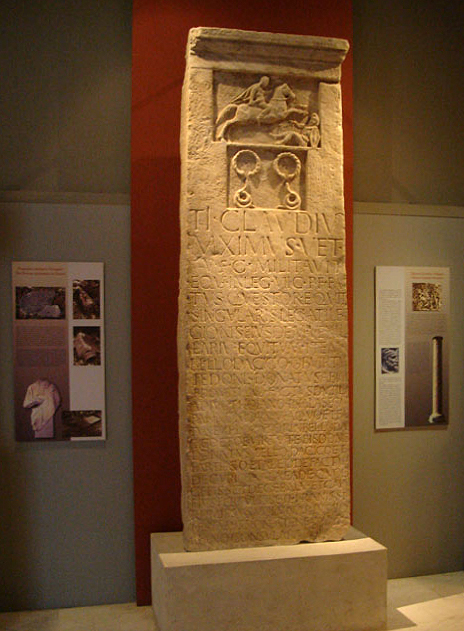
Tiberius Claudius Maximus memorial

The sole source for Maximus' career is inscription Année Épigraphique (1985) 721, engraved on the memorial Maximus erected to himself while still alive, found at Philippi, Greece:

Ti(berius) Claudius / Maximus vet(eranus) / [s(e)] v(ivo) f(aciendum) c(uravit) militavit / eque(s) in leg(ione) VII C(laudia) P(ia) F(ideli) fac/ tus qu(a)estor equit(um) / singularis legati le/ gionis eiusdem vexil/ larius equitum item / bello Dacico ob virtu/ te(m) donis donatus ab Im/ p(eratore) Domitiano factus dupli(carius) / a divo Troiano(!) in ala secu(n)d(a) / Pannoniorum a quo et fac/ tus explorator in bello Da/ cico et ob virtute(m) bis donis / donatus bello Dacico et / Parthico et ab eode(m) factus / decurio in ala eade(m) quod / cepisset Decebalu(m) et caput / eius pertulisset ei Ranissto/ ro missus voluntarius ho/ nesta missione a Terent[io Scau]/ riano consulare [exerci]/ tus provinciae nov[ae Mes]/[opotamiae....

Translation:

Tiberius Claudius Maximus, veteran, arranged this memorial while he was alive. He served as trooper in Legio VII Claudia Pia Fidelis, was made quaestor equitum, then singularis of the legatus legionis of the same legion, then vexillarius of the troopers of that unit, received awards from Emperor Domitian for bravery in the Dacian War, was made duplicarius in the Ala II Pannoniorum by the Emperor Trajan and was made explorator in the Dacian War and twice received awards for bravery in the Dacian and the Parthian War and was made decurio in the same ala by him because he had captured Decebalus and bore his head to him in Ranisstorum. He received his honourable discharge as a voluntarius from the consular commander Terentius Scaurianus, of the army of the Provincia Mesopotamia Nova.

== Origin ==
If the location of his tombstone represents his home-town (as it often did with retired veterans), Maximus was born in Colonia Iulia Augusta Philippensis, a colony of Roman military veterans founded in 42 BC (at Philippi, northern Greece) and much expanded under emperor Augustus (ruled 30 BC – AD 14). He was a Roman citizen at birth, as evidenced by his name and initial enlistment in a Roman legion, for which citizenship was required. At this time, only 10-20% of the Roman Empire's inhabitants held citizenship. It is thus possible that Maximus was a descendant of an Italian veteran settled at Philippi by Augustus. Maximus was probably born around AD 65.

== Early military career ==
Maximus joined the army not later than AD 85. He served as an eques (cavalry trooper) in the cavalry contingent, just 120-strong, of the legion VII Claudia, which was stationed at Viminacium (Moesia) from at least AD 66. He claims to have held three higher positions in the contingent, although it is unclear whether all of these were formal military ranks or simply roles that Maximus had performed.

1. quaestor equitum, probably meaning treasurer of the cavalry contingent. This post is only attested in this inscription. There is an attested fisci curator ("financial manager") in the Praetorian cavalry.
2. singularis legati legionis (member of the legion commander's personal cavalry guard): presumably a select detail, probably one of the 4 turmae (squadrons of 30 men) in the contingent. It is unclear whether a particular turma performed this role (thus according its troopers special status), or whether the turmae simply took turns to guard the general. In the latter case, it was not a rank.
3. vexillarius (standard-bearer). This is the only one of the three positions which was certainly a military rank, a junior officer. In terms of pay, a legionary infantry vexillarius was probably a sesquiplicarius ("one-and-a-half pay man"), i.e. entitled to 50% more pay than a ranker.

Maximus fought in the Dacian War (AD 86–88) of emperor Domitian (ruled 81–96). It is thus probable that he was present at the First Battle of Tapae (86) and Second Battle of Tapae (88). He was decorated for bravery by Domitian.

== Roman conquest of Dacia (AD 101–106) ==
Maximus served in the emperor Trajan's Dacian Wars (101–2 and 105–6). It was probably during these that Maximus was promoted by Trajan out of the legionary cavalry, whose role was limited to escort and communications, into the alae, the elite combat cavalry of the Auxilia corps. Maximus was gazetted as a duplicarius ("double-pay man"), a junior officer in the regiment Ala II Pannoniorum. This move probably resulted in a significant pay-rise for Maximus.

In AD 106, in the closing stage of the conquest of Dacia, Maximus, serving as an explorator (scout) with his unit, was involved in the pursuit of the defeated Dacian king Decebalus, by then a fugitive with only his personal bodyguard of Dacian noblemen left to him. The rest of the Dacian nobility had surrendered to Trajan. It appears that Maximus and his men cornered Decebalus in a mountainous location.

Before Maximus could reach him, Decebalus committed suicide by cutting his own throat, an incident shown on Trajan's Column. Maximus severed Decebalus' head and presented it to the emperor Trajan at his campaign-base at Ranisstorum. As reward, Trajan decorated Maximus and promoted him to the rank of decurion (leader of a turma), the cavalry equivalent of centurion in the infantry.

== Trajan's Parthian War (AD 114–6) ==
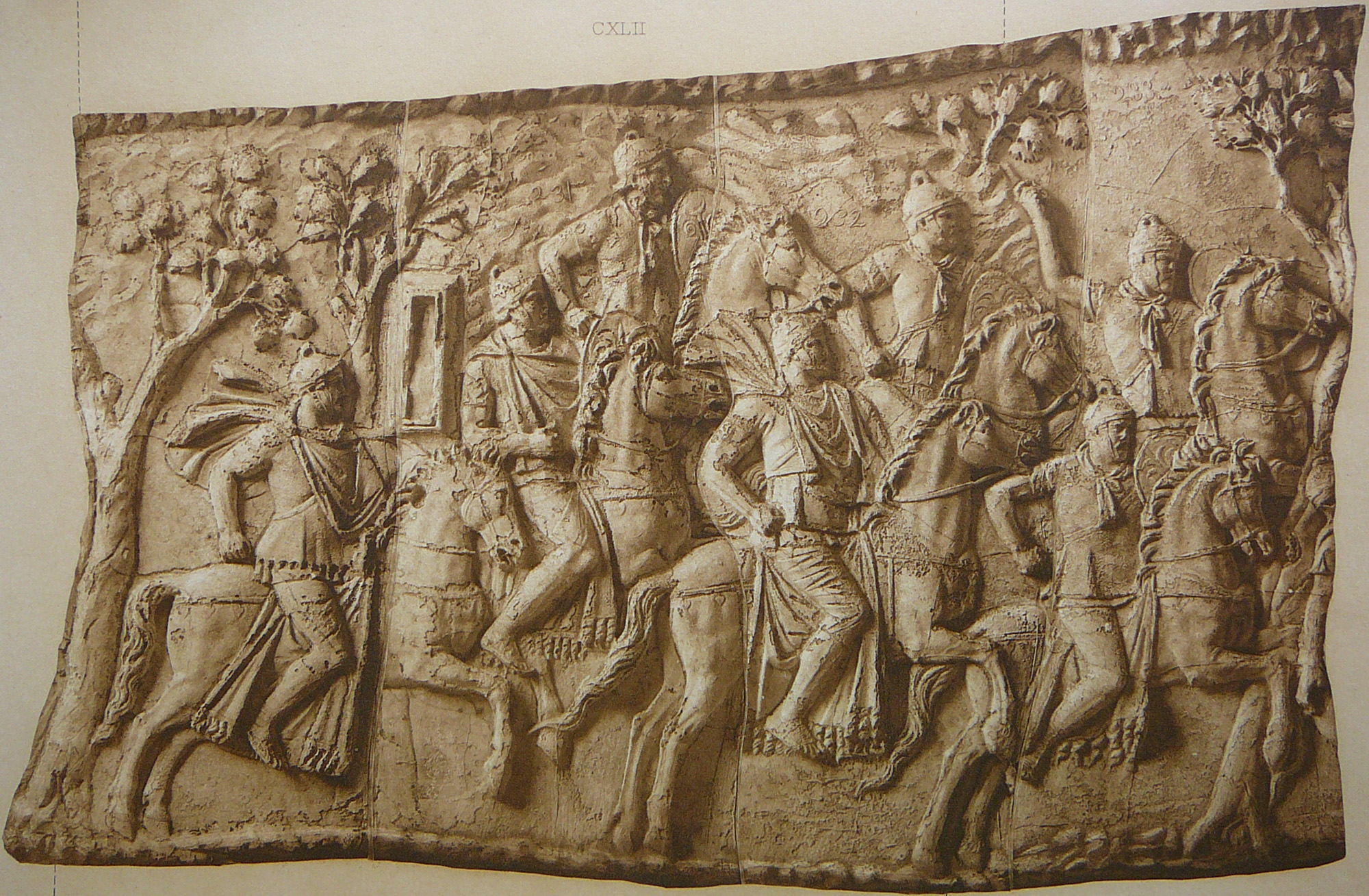
Cast (Cichorius 104) of panel on Trajan's Column, showing start of sequence leading to the capture and death of Dacian king Decebalus. Roman ala cavalry troopers (those wearing neck kerchiefs and mail cuirasses, presumably from Maximus' regiment, Ala II Pannoniorum) and Praetorian Horseguards (troopers wearing mantles, foreground) ride out in pursuit of Decebalus and his remaining supporters. (The previous panel (Cichorius 103) shows many Dacian pileati (noblemen) surrendering to Roman emperor Trajan)

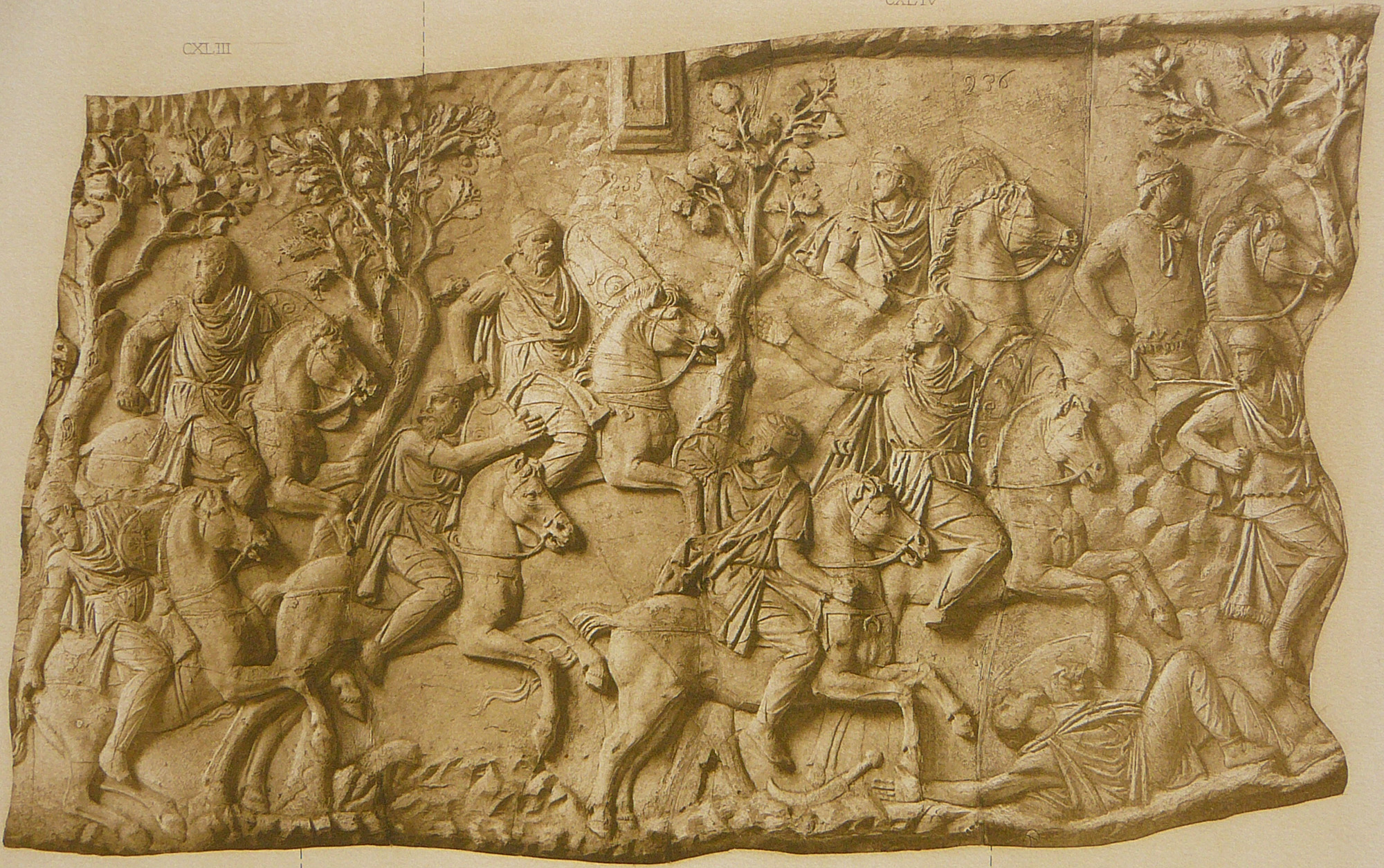
Cast (Cichorius 105) of panel on Trajan's Column, showing Roman cavalry (top right corner) intercepting fleeing Dacian pileati (noblemen) of king Decebalus' bodyguard in mountainous terrain. The pileatus in centre foreground bears a resemblance to king Decebalus as portrayed in the succeeding panel, and may portray the king in flight. Note the fallen Dacian (right foregound) and the falx (curved Dacian-style sword), fallen out of his hand (centre foreground)

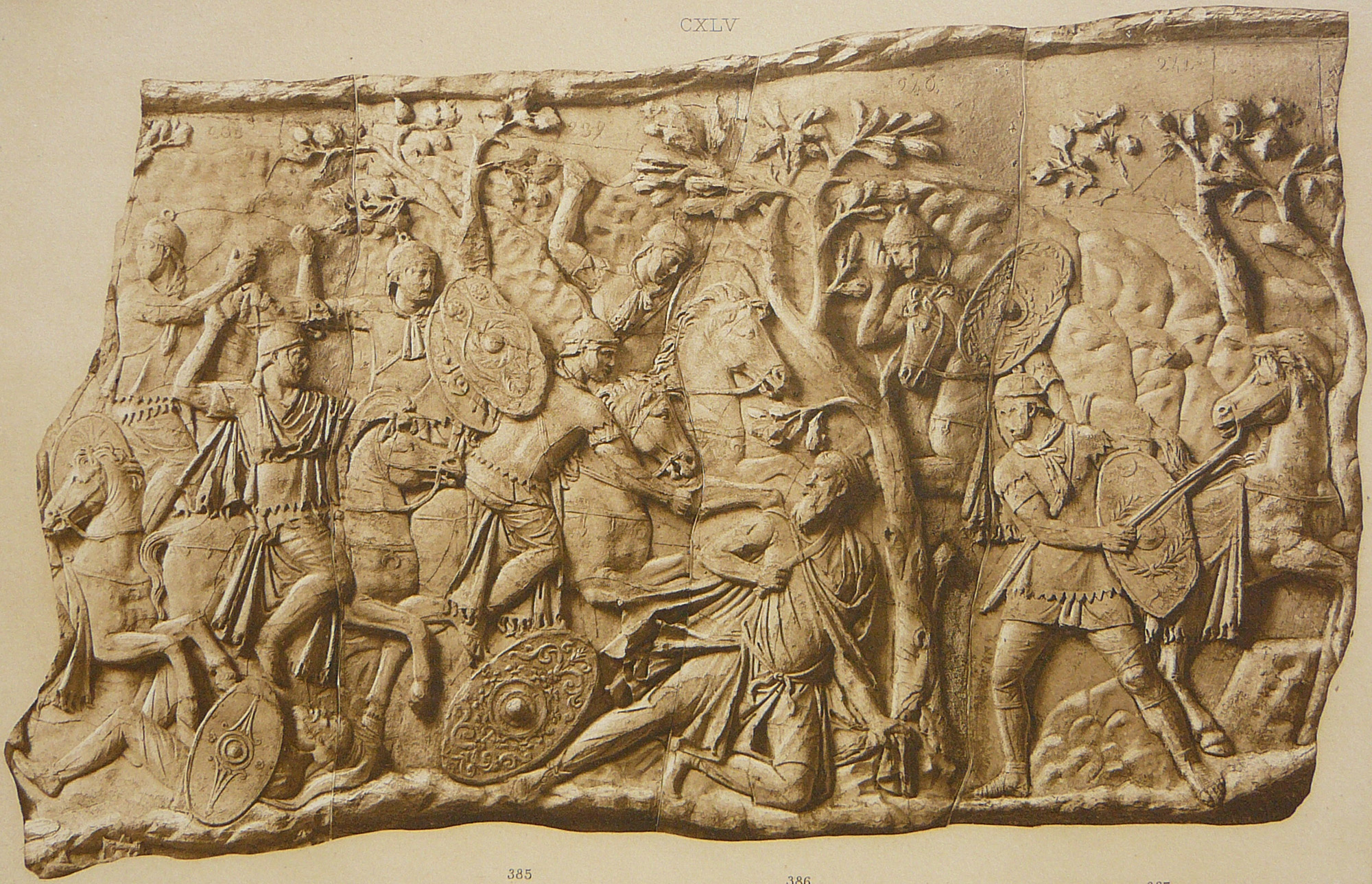
Cast (Cichorius 106) of panel on Trajan's Column, showing the cornering and suicide of Decebalus AD 106. Note the trampled Dacian pileatus (left foreground) and the falx held by Decebalus to his own throat (centre foreground)

Maximus later served in Trajan's Parthian War (114–6) and was again decorated for valour by the emperor. Probably Maximus was already a voluntarius ("volunteer") in this time, like he describes himself at his subsequent missio, because his contracted term of service (25 years) should have expired some years before, in c. 110.

== Retirement ==
Maximus was granted an honourable discharge (honesta missio) in AD 116–7 by Decimus Terentius Scaurianus, one of Trajan's top generals and then commander of Roman forces in the newly established and soon relinquished province of Mesopotamia Nova.

He died after AD 117. While still alive, he designed his own tombstone, which was found at Philippi in Greece, now in the museum at Drama. It bears a representation of 2 torcs that he was awarded for valour and states his claim to have captured Decebalus.

== Death of Decebalus ==
There are two depictions of the incident that made Maximus famous, the pursuit and suicide of king Decebalus.

(A) The bas-relief on his tombstone depicts Maximus, on horseback, bearing a sword as well as shield and two spears, approaching king Decebalus, shown wearing a Phrygian cap, the typical headgear of Dacian noblemen, hence their Roman name of pileati, "the capped ones". Decebalus is shown lying on his back, holding a curved Dacian sword, known to the Romans as a falx, literally "sickle". This image seems stylised to reflect the Thracian Heros stereotype, normally showing a rider spearing an animal or human on the ground, although in this case, Maximus is shown approaching Decebalus holding a sword in his front hand.

(B) Another, much more detailed and less stylised (i.e. probably more factually accurate), depiction of Decebalus' capture is provided by a panel on Trajan's Column (Spiral 22, Panel B; Cichorius 106, above). This should be viewed together with the two preceding panels, which show the sequence of events leading to Decebalus' death.

1. In the first panel, Roman cavalry ride out in hot pursuit of Decebalus and his personal mounted bodyguard of select pileati. Due to artistic conflation, each rider represents dozens, if not hundreds, of troopers. Three of the Roman troopers are shown wearing mantles: in line with the stereotypes of military units as portrayed on the Column, these were probably members of the Emperor's own horseguards, the equites singulares Augusti, the cavalry arm of the Praetorian Guard, most of which had accompanied Trajan from Rome to Dacia. The rest of the troopers do not wear mantles, so their mail cuirasses and neck-kerchiefs are visible: these were presumably troopers of Maximus' own regiment, the Ala II Pannoniorum. It thus appears that the operation to capture Decebalus was entrusted to a joint task-force of elite Praetorian and Ala cavalrymen.
2. The second panel shows the Roman cavalry catching up with and intercepting Decebalus' riders, and possibly Decebalus himself. The Roman troopers' weapons (spears and swords) have disappeared due to stone erosion by pollution. The sequence of events, conflated in order to fit the panels, shows that Decebalus' bodyguards were destroyed: note the one trampled under the Roman horses' hooves in the right foreground.
3. According to the third panel, after the last of his bodyguards fell (left foreground), the king escaped alone to a rocky place, where he was apparently reached by a Roman trooper who had dismounted and was leading his horse on foot, presumably because the terrain was too steep or rough to ride (right foreground). This trooper may represent Maximus, given his role as scout-leader. An alternative view, supported by Speidel, is that the mounted trooper shown nearest to Decebalus was Maximus, as this figure appears replicated in Maximus' own funerary monument.

Most likely, troopers were under orders to capture Decebalus alive if possible, so that he could form the centrepiece of Trajan's forthcoming Triumph in Rome, to celebrate his Dacian victory. The traditional format would have the defeated enemy leader dragged in chains before the triumphator's chariot. The climax of the show was when the Emperor decided the captive's fate: in some cases, the captive's life was spared e.g. Claudius' reprieve for the British king Caractacus, who had led the fierce resistance (AD 43–51) to the Roman invasion of Britain.

Otherwise, the captive would be executed by garrote, and his corpse thrown down the Gemonian Steps and left to rot. In this case, it was Decebalus' head that ended up at the foot of the Steps.

As a result of these images, it has been suggested by some scholars that Decebalus was still alive, although mortally wounded, when seized by the Romans. Maximus himself claimed to have "captured" Decebalus. But a passage in the Epitome of the History of Rome of Cassius Dio makes clear that he was already dead: "Decebalus, when his capital had been destroyed and his whole territory occupied, and he was himself in danger of being captured, killed himself. His head was brought to Rome".
