= Legio VII Claudia =

Imperial Roman legion

Map of the Roman Empire in AD 125, under emperor Hadrian, showing the Legio VII Claudia, stationed on the river Danube at Viminacium (Kostolac, Serbia), in Moesia Superior province, from AD 58 until the 4th century

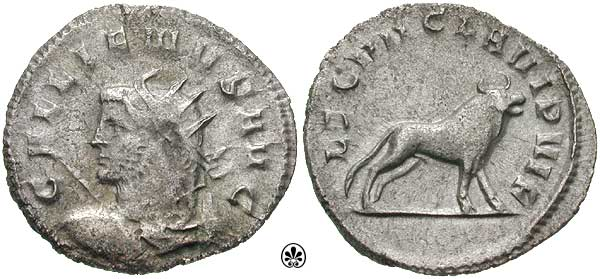
Gallienus coin, celebrating LEG VII CLA VI P VI F (Seventh legion Claudia, six times faithful, six times loyal, and bearing the bull, symbol of the legion, on the reverse.

Legio VII Claudia (Latin for "The 7th Claudian Legion") was a legion of the Ancient Roman army.

== History ==
Legio VII was the first legion Julius Caesar raised for his campaigns in Cisalpine Gaul. In Caesar's account of the battle against the Nervians, it seems that it was employed during the expedition through western Gaul led by Caesar's deputy Crassus. In 56 BC, the Seventh was present during the Venetic campaign. During the crisis caused by Vercingetorix, it fought in the neighbourhood of Lutetia; it must have been active at Alesia and it was certainly involved in the mopping-up operations among the Bellovaci. Legio VII was one of the two legions used in Caesar's invasions of Britain in 55-54 BC, and played a crucial role in the Battle of Pharsalus in 48 BC.

At one point Caesar's Legio VII was disbanded, and its veterans settled at Capua. However, Octavian had need of soldiers and recalled its members to service to fight in the Battle of Mutina. Its early nickname Macedonia attested in four inscriptions may reflect it was at the Battle of Philippi; otherwise, this attests that Legio VII was stationed in Macedonia before it was redeployed to Tilurium, Dalmatia.

The legion was present in Dalmatia when Lucius Arruntius Camillus Scribonianus rebelled against the emperor Claudius in AD 42, but refused to support Scribonianus. For this the legion received the honorary titles Claudia pia fidelis. Parker postulates that when Legio IV Scythica was transferred from Moesia to Syria between AD 55 and 62, Legio VII Claudia was moved to Moesia to replace it.

During the Year of Four Emperors, the legion followed the lead of Legio III Gallica in revolting against Vitellius and declaring for Vespasian. It was part of the army that Marcus Aponius Saturninus lead into northern Italy, and when Saturninus fell out of favor with his troops followed Marcus Antonius Primus in the subsequent Second Battle of Bedriacum.

Following Vespasian's victory over Vitellius, Legio VII Claudia was ordered back to Moesia. An inscription from the reign of Antoninus Pius attests that it remained in this station, although Moesia had been divided into Moesia Superior (where the legion had its headquarters), and Moesia Inferior. The legion existed at least until the end of the 4th century, guarding the middle Danube.

Tiberius Claudius Maximus, the Roman soldier who brought the head of Decebalus to the emperor Trajan, served in Legio VII Claudia. An inscription in Pompeii revealed that a certain Floronius also served in the seventh legion. The inscription says: "Floronius, privileged soldier of the 7th legion, was here. The women did not know of his presence. Only six women came to know, too few for such a stallion."

== Attested members ==
Name	Rank	Time frame	Province	Source
Caius Iulius Urbanis	Princep	c. 25 BCE	Hispania	Carved into the wall at the Cova d Aigua, Montgo Massif, Denia, Spain.
Tettius Julianus	legatus	68-69	Moesia	Tacitus, Histories, I.79
Plotius Grypus	legatus	69-70	Moesia	Tacitus, Histories, III.52; IV.39, 40
Veturius Paccianus	legatus	c. 168	Moesia Superior	
Gaius Memmius Fidus Julius Albius	legatus	c. 180/182	Moesia Superior	CIL VIII, 12442 = ILS 1110
Gaius Caesonius Macer Rufinianus	legatus	c. 187/190	Moesia Superior	CIL XIV, 390 = ILS 1182
Marcus Laelius Maximus	legatus	195	Moesia Superior	CIL III, 8103
Titus Terrasidius	praefectus equitum	56–55 BC	Gallia	Commentarii de Bello Gallico, 3.7
Publius Palpellius Clodius Quirinalis	military tribune	c. 50	Moesia	CIL V, 533
Lucius Vipstanus Messalla	military tribune	69	Moesia	Tacitus, Histories, III.9
Galeo Tettienus Severus Marcus Eppuleius Proculus Tiberius Caepio Hispo	military tribune	between 85 and 90		CIL V, 5813
Lucius Valerius Proculus	military tribune	1st half 2nd century	Moesia Superior	CIL II, 1970
Gaius Valerius Florinum	military tribune	1st half 2nd century	Moesia Superior	CIL XIV, 2957
Gaius Vettius Gratus Sabinianus	military tribune	c.205	Moesia Superior	
Tiberius Claudius Maximus	vexillarius	between 85 and 90		AE 1985, 721

== See also ==
- List of Roman legions
