= Ranisstorum =

Ancient Roman fortification located east of Sarmizegetusa

Ranisstorum was an Ancient Roman fort located east of Sarmizegetusa, the former capital of the old kingdom of Dacia. The exact location of this fortification is now lost, but it is possible that it was the present location called Sub Cununi, near Gradistea de Munte in Romania.

In 106 AD, Tiberius Claudius Maximus, of the Roman army, captured a fugitive Dacian king Decebalus. Moments afterwards the king committed suicide in order not to be captured alive and suffer the same humiliation as Vercingetorix. Maximus cut off Decebalus' head and right hand and brought them on a shield to Emperor Trajan, who was camped at that time at this fort. As a result of this action, Maximus was made decurion and was given a second medal for bravery (the first was received from Emperor Domitian in 87 AD).
