= Tettidia gens =

Ancient Roman family

The gens Tettidia, occasionally found as Tettiedia, was an obscure plebeian family at ancient Rome. No members of this gens are mentioned by Roman writers, but several are known from inscriptions.

== Origin ==
The nomen Tettidius belongs to a class of gentilicia originally derived from cognomina ending in -idus. Later these names were also formed from other gentilicia, as -idius came to be regarded as a regular gentile-forming suffix. Where the stem of the original name ended in a vowel, the suffix might become -edius, and sometimes both forms are found alongside one another, as is the case with Tettidius and Tettiedius, evidently formed from the nomen Tettius. The latter name is thought to be of Oscan origin, perhaps from teta, a dove, and in fact most of the inscriptions of the Tettidia gens are from towns in Samnium.

== Praenomina ==
The Tettidii used a variety of common praenomina, including Gaius, Lucius, Publius, Quintus, and Titus, along with Numerius, which was uncommon at Rome, but more widespread in Oscan-speaking regions, including Samnium.

== Members ==
This list includes abbreviated praenomina. For an explanation of this practice, see filiation.

- Publius Tettidius L. f. Balbus, named in a sepulchral inscription from Corfinium in Samnium, dating from the early or middle first century BC.
- Titus Tettiedius N. f., buried at the present site of Collelongo, formerly part of Samnium, in the late first century BC, or early first century AD.
- Titus Tettiedius T. f. Tiro, buried at the present site of Collelongo, in the late first century BC, or early first century AD.
- Tettidia L. l., a freedwoman, named along with Gaius Tettidius and others, in a sepulchral inscription from Canusium in Apulia, dating from the first half of the first century.
- Gaius Tettidius, named along with the freedwoman Tettidia and others, in a sepulchral inscription from Canusium, dating from the first half of the first century.
- Gaius Tettidius Primus, buried along with Quintus Lucilius Florus in a first- or second-century tomb at Aquileia in Venetia and Histria.
- Lucius Tettidius L. f. Varus, a man of aedilician rank, was buried at Aequiculi in Samnium, in a tomb dating from the first or second century.
- Tettidia Blaste, buried at Rome, in a tomb built by her husband, Quintus Tettidius Hermes, dating between the middle of the first century and the end of the second.
- Quintus Tettidius Hermes, built a tomb at Rome for his wife, Tettidia Blaste, dating between the middle of the first century and the end of the second.
- Tettidia, the mistress of Primus, a slave buried in a second-century tomb at Interpromium in Samnium, aged fourteen, with a monument from his mother, Hymnis, and Raius Anteros.
- Tettidia Faventina, dedicated a second-century tomb at Marruvium in Samnium for her son, Lucius Mindius Primitivus, a decurion of the Marsi, aged twenty-two years, five months, and two days.

=== Undated Tettidii ===
- Tettidia, buried at Amiternum in Samnium, in a tomb dedicated by her sons, both named Quintus Tettidius.
- Numerius Tettidius, buried at Marruvium.
- Quintus Tettidius Sp. f., the name of two brothers, who dedicated a tomb at Amiternum for their mother, Tettidia.
- Publius Tettidius Gratinus, dedicated a tomb at Peltuinum in Samnium for his wife, Advenia [...]diae.

== See also ==
- List of Roman gentes

== Bibliography ==
- Theodor Mommsen et alii, Corpus Inscriptionum Latinarum (The Body of Latin Inscriptions, abbreviated CIL), Berlin-Brandenburgische Akademie der Wissenschaften (1853–present).
- René Cagnat et alii, L'Année épigraphique (The Year in Epigraphy, abbreviated AE), Presses Universitaires de France (1888–present).
- George Davis Chase, "The Origin of Roman Praenomina", in Harvard Studies in Classical Philology, vol. VIII, pp. 103–184 (1897).
