= Galeo Tettienus Severus Marcus Eppuleius Proculus Tiberius Caepio Hispo =

Roman senator

Galeo Tettienus Severus Marcus Eppuleius Proculus Tiberius Caepio Hispo was a Roman senator active in the late 1st and early 2nd centuries AD, who occupied a number of offices in the imperial service. He was suffect consul around the year 102 as the colleague of Rubrius Gallus.

== His name ==
His polyonymous name poses some problems. It is provided in differing partial forms by two inscriptions -- one found at Mediolanum, the other at Ravenna -- which also provide details of his career, as well as a third, fragmentary inscription from Ephesus that provides the complete name. Olli Salomies discusses the evidence, and explains the first portion of his name as the product of an adoption by a Tettienus Severus, possibly the suffect consul of 76, Galeo Tettienus Petronianus. On the other hand, Mireille Corbier, in her monograph on prefects of the aerarium militare, argues that the third element in Caepio Hispo's name is correctly read as "Serenus", not "Severus", and identifies his adoptive father with Petronianus' brother Titus Tettienus Serenus, suffect consul in 81. Ronald Syme notes that "the Tetteni come from Asisium in Umbria."

When Caepio Hispo was adopted is unclear: although the evidence suggests this may have occurred later in life between his tenure as consul and governor of Asia (thus being a testamentary adoption); on other grounds, Salomies believes the adoption was performed earlier in his life, before the birth of his son.

As for the second element in his name, Marcus Eppuleius Proculus, Salomies suggests at one point it came from the maternal side of his family, or a more distant relative, but due to the location in the name of the tribe and the filiation, he doubted this. In response to that complication, Salomies suggests that his father's name consisted of both the second and third elements--i.e., his name was "Lucius Eppuleius (Proculus ?) Tiberius Caepio Hispo".

Regardless of the complications of the second element in his name, Salomies believes that the identity of Caepio Hispo's family origins can be found in the third or final element. The nomen "Caepio" is very unusual but attested in Mantua. The cognomen "Hispo" is also rare, but attested in the Transpadana region; the name of the daughter of Pliny the Younger’s elderly friend Quintus Corellius Rufus, Corellia Hispulla, is one example. Salomies also notes that Caepio Hispo's tribe, "Claudia", is common in Northern Italy. Mireille Corbier, in her monograph on prefects of the aerarium militare, suggests he may have been the brother of Caepia Procula, wife of Marcus Aquilius Regulus the delator.

== Career ==
The career of Caepio Hispo is documented in the two Italian inscriptions mentioned above, each with its own problems: the one from Mediolanum has an inconsistent order of offices, while the one from Ravenna is incomplete, lacking all information prior to his time as consul. This has led to some disagreement over the exact order Caepio Hispo held the offices recorded; the following repeats the conclusions of the latest discussion.

The earliest known position he held was as a member of the decemviri stlitibus iudicandis, one of the vigintiviri, a minor collegium young senators served in at the start of their careers. Next he was assigned to serve as a military tribune in Legio VII Claudia stationed at Viminacium in Moesia Superior. This was followed by the traditional series of republican magistracies: first, quaestor assigned to assist with the administration of Rome, followed by plebeian tribune, then praetor. Syme argues the date of his praetorship fell in the years 90–94. The sortition allotted to Caepio Hispo the public province of Hispania Baetica to govern; Werner Eck has dated his tenure in that province to 95/96. The two inscriptions disagree on whether his prefecture of the aerarium militare was before or after this governorship, but Corbier observed that in four cases the prefecture followed administration of Baetica and there are no cases of the opposite order, so Caepio Hispo was the successor of Pliny the Younger as the prefect of the aerarium militare (97-99), after which Caepio Hispo acceded to suffect consul.

After his consulate, between 101 and 103, we have our only mention of the senator in historical literature. Pliny the Younger records a lawsuit made by the Bithynians against their former governor Julius Bassus for extortion; one of those present was Caepio Hispo. Pliny states that Caepio Hispo made a motion to fine Bassus without stripping him of his senatorial rank; although this motion was favored by many senators, the consuls who presided over the session did not allow a vote on the motion.

Another event after his consulate was the admission of Caepio Hispo to the College of Pontiffs, one of the most prestigious orders of priests in ancient Roman religion. His last documented office was as proconsular governor of Asia in 118/119. Caepio Hispo's life is a blank after that.

== Family ==
Caepio Hispo is known to have married Annia Quartilla, the daughter of the senator Appius Annius Marsus. The Ephesus inscription attests that they had a son, Galeo Tettienus Serno Lucius Gavius Liccianus Marcus Eppuleius Proculus Tiberius Caepio Hispo.
