= Terrasidius =

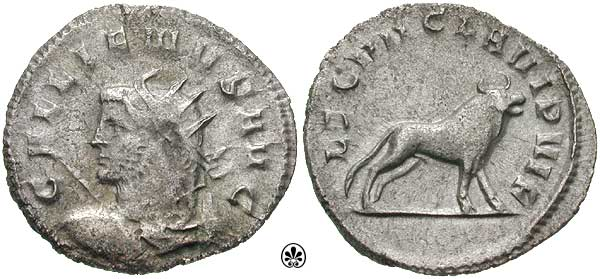
Gallienus coin, celebrating LEG VII CLA VI P VI F (Seventh legion Claudia, six times faithful, six times loyal, and bearing the bull, symbol of the legion, on the reverse.

Titus Terrasidius was a Roman Knight of the Equestrian order and an officer of the cavalry in Julius Caesar's Legio VII Claudia. He and other officers of the legion were sent out to negotiate provisions for the winter of 56–55 BC; they were captured by Breton tribes who were then subjugated as Caesar describes in his Commentarii de Bello Gallico:

The occasion of that war was this: Publius Crassus, a young man, had taken up his winter-quarters with the seventh legion among the Andes, who border upon the Ocean. He, as there was a scarcity of corn in those parts, sent out some officers of cavalry [who would be equites], and several military tribunes [who would be of senatorial rank] among the neighbouring states, for the purpose of procuring corn and provision; in which number Titus Terrasidius was sent among the Esubii; Marcus Trebius Gallus among the Curiosolitae; Quintus Velanius, [and] Titus Silius, amongst the Veneti.
