= Gaius Dillius Aponianus =

Gaius Dillius Aponianus was a Roman senator and general, who played a role in the Year of Four Emperors. Aponianus ended up supporting Vespasian, and as a reward he was appointed suffect consul during the early years of that emperor.

According to an inscription recovered in Cordoba, Spain, Aponianus was of Spanish origins. He belonged to the Sergia voting tribe, and was the son of a Lucius and the grandson of an Aulus. Another senator active at the time, Gaius Dillius Vocula, also belonged to the Sergia voting tribe but was the son of an Aulus; these suggest that Aponianus was the nephew of Vocula.

== Life ==
The inscription from Corduba provides the cursus honorum for Aponianus up to the year 69. The first position recorded was his commission as a military tribune with Legio IV Macedonica. He was then appointed as a tresviri capitales, one of the four magistracies that comprised the vigintiviri; this was the least desirable of the four, for men who held that office rarely had a successful career: Anthony Birley could find only five tresviri capitales who went on to be governors of consular imperial provinces. His next office was as quaestor of the province of Sicily, and upon completion of this traditional Republican magistracy Aponianus would be enrolled in the Senate. The traditional Republican magistracy plebeian tribune followed, and after that praetor, which enabled him to hold important appointments. Late in the year 69 Aponianus was commissioned legatus legionis or commander of Legio III Gallica.

== The Year 69 ==
Aponianus does not appear to have been aligned with any of the four emperors for most of the conflict, aside from being under Vitellius at the time. He asked the governor of Moesia—his relative Marcus Aponius Saturninus—for assistance. Saturninus informed Vitellius of the legion's refusal, but not that their allegiance was aligned with Vespasian. Aponianus commanded Legio III Gallica which went on to be instrumental in inflaming legionary sentiment against Vitellius (and for Vespasian), and in the Second Battle of Bedriacum, where they fought for Vespasian.

== Later career ==
Aponianus is believed to have served as a suffect consul some time around 71 or 73. His name appears as consul in the primary sources, but none provide the exact year. Paul Gillivan suggests the possible dates for his tenure as suffect consul could be November/December 71, the last half of 72, or March/April of 73. However, more recently Giuseppi Camodeca has completed the list of consuls for 71, so the available dates for his tenure are now limited to 72 and 73.

There is epigraphical evidence that, as a member of the curator riparum et alvei Tiberis, he was responsible for repairs made on the right bank of the Tiber River in 73.
