= Titus Junius Montanus =

Titus Junius Montanus was a Roman of the first century and suffect consul in AD 81 with Lucius Julius Vettius Paullus as his colleague. An inscription found in Alexandria Troas indicates that was his hometown, making Montanus the first person from the Greek portion of the Roman Empire admitted to the Roman Senate.

Syme further identifies Montanus with "the slow fat senator of Juvenal 4.107", and suggests that he may be the Montanus mentioned in another passage (4.137).

== Life ==
The inscription from Alexandria indicates his father's name was Gaius, and he was a member of the Roman tribe Aniesus. According to Ronald Syme, his ancestor is "patently" the homonymous Titus Junius Montanus, an equestrian officer of the same tribe as he, who served in the late Augustan period.

Montanus began his career in the Imperial service likely in his teens as a tresviri aere argento auro flando feriundo, a prestigious position usually allocated to patricians. His next office was as a military tribune in Legio V Macedonica. As quaestor, Montanus was assigned his home province of Bithynia et Pontus. Montanus held these posts, as well as the subsequent offices of plebeian tribune and praetor, under Nero, who apparently favored the young senator.

Vespasian had a different opinion of Montanus, for the only office he held under that emperor was praetorian proconsul of Sicily at an undetermined date. Syme also speculates that Montanus was obtained the suffect consulate due to "special favour from Titus". Jones agrees that Titus' "assessment, it is clear, differed substantially" about Montanus, speculating that "perhaps Montanus and Titus had known each other from Nero's court, for they were about the same age." Jones notes he retained imperial favor after Titus' death "for his conviviality rather than for any other discernible quality."

His inscription also attests that Montanus was a member of the Titii sodales, and was appointed patron of an unnamed city.

Political offices
Preceded by Marcus Roscius Coelius, and Gaius Julius Juvenalis as suffect consuls	Suffect consul of the Roman Empire; 81 with Lucius Julius Vettius Paullus	Succeeded by Gaius Scoedius Natta Pinarius, and Titus Tettienus Serenus as suffect consuls
