= Baebius Massa =

1st century AD Roman senator and provincial governor

Baebius Massa, (Gallia c. AD 40-45 – after 93) was a governor of Hispania Baetica in 92. He was an equestrian procurator of Africa in 70 and was promoted to the Senate by Vespasian as a reward for his part in the suppression of a revolt.

In 91 Baebius Massa was governor of Baetica (western Spain), his last recorded post. Two years later he was accused of plundering the province and maladministration of which he was condemned in 93; but he avoided punishment through the favour of the emperor Domitian, under whom he became a notorious informer.

Pliny the Younger and Herennius Senecio were chosen to prosecute, and Tacitus mentions the trial briefly at the end of the Agricola in such a way as to imply that Baebius Massa was still an active threat even after this case.
