= Verus (senator) =

Roman usurper for the imperial throne (died 219)

Verus (died 219) was a Roman usurper.

Verus was a centurion, who had successfully risen to the rank of Roman Senator. He was the commander of the Legio III Gallica, a legion located in Syria, which supported Elagabalus bid for power (218).

Soon, however, the soldiers disenchanted with the reign of Elagabalus, and in the winter of 218–219, Verus took the opportunity, proclaiming himself Roman Emperor, and leading the rebellion of the Third Legion. However, Elagabalus had Verus executed, dispersed the legion, and stripped Tyre, where its headquarters were, of its status of metropolis.
