= Marcus Roscius Coelius =

1st century AD Roman military officer

Marcus Roscius Coelius (or Caelius) was a Roman military officer of the 1st century AD. He was appointed suffect consul for the nundinium March-April AD 81 with Gaius Julius Juvenalis as his colleague.

There is some uncertainty about his name. Tacitus calls him "Caelius", but the Acta Fratrum Arvalium calls him "Marcus Roscius Coelius". Anthony Birley suggests he may have had additional names, including "Murena"; he notes that there are several Roscii Murenae in the second century, "perhaps his descendants".

Coelius was the legate of the Legio XX Valeria Victrix, stationed in Britain in 68 AD. He was on bad terms with the provincial governor, Marcus Trebellius Maximus, and took the opportunity during the turmoil of the year of four emperors to foment mutiny against him. Trebellius lost all authority with the army, which sided with Coelius, and fled to the protection of Vitellius in Germania. Coelius and his fellow legates briefly ruled the province until Vitellius, now emperor, sent Marcus Vettius Bolanus to be the new governor in late 69.

The year of civil war ended when Vespasian took the Empire. In 71 he recalled Coelius, whose treacherous behaviour had been made known to him, and replaced him as commander of the XX Valeria Victrix with Gnaeus Julius Agricola. Coelius was appointed suffect consul in 81. Birley notes,"The fact that he did not achieve the fasces until four years after his successor as legionary legate suggests that his progress may have been a little impeded on account of his conduct in 69."

Political offices
Preceded by Lucius Flavius Silva Nonius Bassus, and Lucius Asinius Pollio Verrucosus as suffect consuls	Suffect consul of the Roman Empire; 81 with Gaius Julius Juvenalis	Succeeded by Lucius Julius Vettius Paullus, and Titus Junius Montanus as suffect consuls
