= Gaius Javolenus Calvinus =

Gaius Javolenus Calvinus was a Roman senator of the 2nd century AD who occupied a number of offices in the imperial service, as well as serving as suffect consul between 140 and 143.

An inscription found in Grottaferrata in Campania provides his full name: Gaius Javolenus Calvinus Geminius Capito Cornelius Pollio Squilla Quintus Vulcacius Scuppidius Verus. Géza Alföldy suggests that the second and third elements in his name are due to adoption by a relative of Javolenus Priscus.

The same inscription from Grottaferra provides information about his cursus honorum as far as his consulate. Calvinus began as one of the decemviri stlitibus judicandis, one of the four boards that comprise the vigintiviri. This was followed by a commission as military tribune in Legio V Macedonica, stationed in Syria. Calvinus then served as quaestor in Africa. Later, he was the emperor Hadrian's candidate for the other traditional Roman magistracies of plebeian tribune and praetor; this dates the last prior to Hadrian's death in 138. As ex-praetor, Calvinus was appointed legatus legionis or commander of Legio III Gallica, also stationed in Syria, which Alföldy dates to around 138. He governed the imperial province of Lusitania, which Alföldy dates to the first years of the reign of Antoninus Pius, then the public province of Hispania Baetica, but his tenure in the second province cannot be dated any more closely than between the years 138 and 143.

The life of Calvinus is a blank after his consulate.
