= Legio III Gallica =

Roman legion

Third Legion Gallica
- Legio III Gallica; Legio Tertia Gallica
- Map of the Roman Empire in AD 125, under emperor Hadrian, showing the Third Legion Gallica, stationed at Syria province from 30 BC to the 4th century
- Active: 49 or 48 BCE until the 4th century
- Country: Roman Republic (closing years) and Roman Empire
- Type: Roman legion

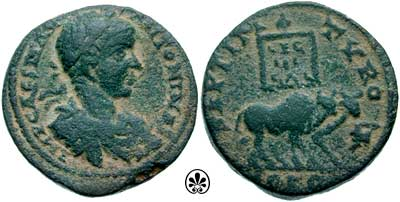
Two bulls, symbol of the III Gallica, bearing the legion standard LEG III GAL. Coin of Elagabalus, who became emperor with the decisive support of this legion.

Legio III Gallica (lit. Third Legion "Gallic") was a legion of the Imperial Roman army. The cognomen Gallica suggests that its earliest recruits came from veterans of the Gallic legions of Julius Caesar, a supposition supported by its emblem, a bull, a symbol associated with Caesar. The legion was based for most of its existence at Raphanea, Roman Syria, and was still active in Egypt in the early 4th century.

== Under the Republic ==
The legion was founded in either 49 or 48 BC by Julius Caesar to help in Caesar's war against Pompey. The soldiers of the legion were exclusively from Transalpine Gaul and Cisalpine Gaul. After Caesar died, the III Gallica joined Mark Antony's army. While in the service of Mark Antony the legion would fight at the battle of Munda and Phillipi. They were included in the army levied by Fulvia and Lucius Antonius to oppose Octavian, but ended by surrendering in Perugia, in the winter of 41 BC.

== Under the Empire ==
=== Service under Herod and service in Antony's campaign against the Parthians ===
The legion served in Antony's Parthian War in 36 BC. After the battle of Actium and Antony's suicide during Antony's Civil War, the III Gallica was sent again to the East, where they garrisoned the province of Syria.

=== Campaigning under Corbulo and transferring to the Danube ===
After Gnaeus Domitius Corbulo had been appointed to campaign against the Parthians over the control of Armenia, he withdrew III Gallica along with Legio VI Ferrata to form the core of his army. The campaign lasted from 58-68 AD. Corbulo's successes triggered the emperor Nero's resentment and eventually the general was forced to commit suicide. In 68 AD, III Gallica was transferred to the province of Moesia on the Danube.

=== Year of the Four Emperors ===
In the Year of the Four Emperors in 69, the legion, and the rest of the Danubian army, aligned first with Otho, then with Vespasian. Along with three other legions, the III Gallica joined Legio VII Gemina under its commander Marcus Antonius Primus in marching on units supporting Vitellius in northern Italy. The decisive clash came at the Second Battle of Bedriacum, where the Vitellians were defeated. The III Gallica had during its service in Syria adopted the custom of saluting the rising sun, and when dawn broke at Bedriacum they turned east to do so. The Vitellian forces thought that they were saluting reinforcements from the east and lost heart. From Bedriacum the legion advanced with Primus on Rome to rescue Vespasian's family and supporters in that city, and encamped in Capua when Mucianus arrived from the east. As one of his actions to secure control of Rome, Mucianus dispersed the units loyal to Primus, sending the legion back to Syria.

=== In Syria ===
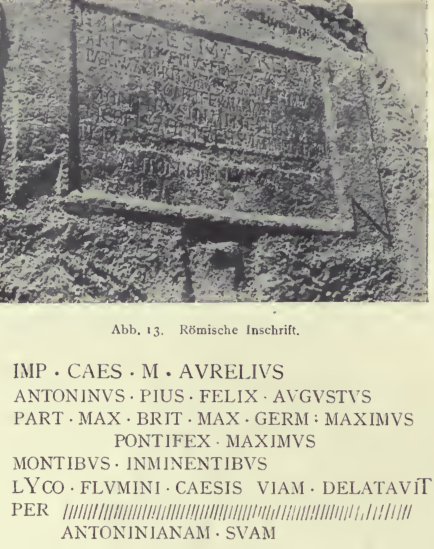
Inscription of Legio III Gallica at the Nahr al Kalb inscriptions

On returning to Syria, the legion made its base at Raphanaea. While the legion was in Syria, vexillations may have fought in Trajan and Domitian's Dacian wars. It is also likely that the legion took part in Trajan's Parthian wars. In 132 the III Gallica was called on to crush the Jewish rebellion. An inscription found in Rome attests that towards the end of Hadrian's reign the legion was still based in Syria. They also took part in Lucius Verus' campaign against the Parthians under Gaius Avidius Cassius.

During the Year of the Five Emperors the Syrian Legions, including the III Gallica, supported Pescennius Niger. However, Septimius Severus emerged as the victor. Septimius Severus would campaign against the Parthian Empire; one of the legions that fought in this campaign was the III Gallica. During the reign of Roman Emperor Caracalla, the Legion left an inscription amongst the Commemorative stelae of Nahr el-Kalb.

The legion played a central role in the early reign of Elagabalus. In 218, during Macrinus' reign, Julia Maesa went to Raphana, Syria, where the legion was based under the command of Publius Valerius Comazon. She largely donated to the legion, which, in turn, proclaimed emperor Julia Maesa's grandson, the fourteen-year-old Elagabalus, on the dawn of 16 May. On June 8, 218 near Antioch. Gannys, Elagabalus' tutor, defeated Macrinus and his son, with the help of the III Gallica and the other legions of the East. In 219, the legion, exhausted by Elagabalus excesses, supported its commander, senator Verus, who proclaimed himself emperor. Elagabalus had Verus executed, and dispersed the legion. The legionaries were transferred namely to III Augusta, stationed in the Africa provinces. However, the following emperor, Alexander Severus, reconstituted the legion and redeployed them back in Syria. Valerius Comazon entered in Elagabalus court, becoming prefect of the Praetorian Guard and consul in 220. The legion partook in Alexander's campaign against the Sassanids. Its subsequent history is obscure.

== Attested members ==
Name	Rank	Time frame	Province	Source
Lucius Artorius Castus	centurio	between 150 and 250	Syria	CIL III, 1919
Titus Aurelius Fulvus	legatus legionis	65-69	Moesia	CIL III, 6741 = ILS 232; Tacitus, Histories, i.79
Gaius Dillius Aponianus	legatus legionis	69-70	Moesia	Tacitus, Histories, iii.10,11
Lucius Aurelius Gallus	legatus legionis	121-123	Syria	CIL VI, 1356 = ILS 1109
Gaius Javolenus Calvinus	legatus legionis	c. 138	Syria	CIL XIV, 2499
Marcus Servilius Fabianus Maximus	legatus legionis	c. 150–c. 153	Syria	CIL VI, 1517
Avidius Cassius	legatus legionis	c. 162–c.166	Syria	
Verus	legatus legionis	c. 218 - 219	Syria	Dio Cassius, 80.7; Herodian, 5
Arrius Varus	primipilus	69	Moesia	Tacitus, Histories, iii.16, iv.19
Marcus Statius Priscus	tribunus angusticlavius	130s	Syria	CIL VI, 1523 = ILS 1092
Sextus Appius Sex. f. Severus	tribunus laticlavius	between 68 and 76	Syria	CIL VI, 1348 = ILS 1003
Gaius Plinius Caecilius Secundus	tribunus laticlavius	80s	Syria	CIL V, 5262
Gaius Bruttius Praesens	tribunus laticlavius	c. 136	Syria	CIL X, 408 = ILS 1117
Marcus Messius Rusticianus	tribunus laticlavius	c. 137-140	Syria	
Lucius Pullaienus Gargilius Antiquus	tribunus laticlavius	c. 145	Syria	CIL III, 7394

== See also ==
- List of Roman legions
