= Hispania Baetica =

Roman province in the southwest of the Iberian Peninsula

Provincia Hispania Baetica
- Province of the Roman Empire
- 14 BC – 5th century
- The Roman province of Hispania Baetica, c. 125 AD
- Capital: Corduba
- Area
  - Coordinates: 37.5000°N 6.0000°W
- Historical era: Antiquity
  - Established: 14 BC
  - Visigothic conquest: 5th century
Preceded by	Succeeded by
Hispania Ulterior	Visigothic Kingdom

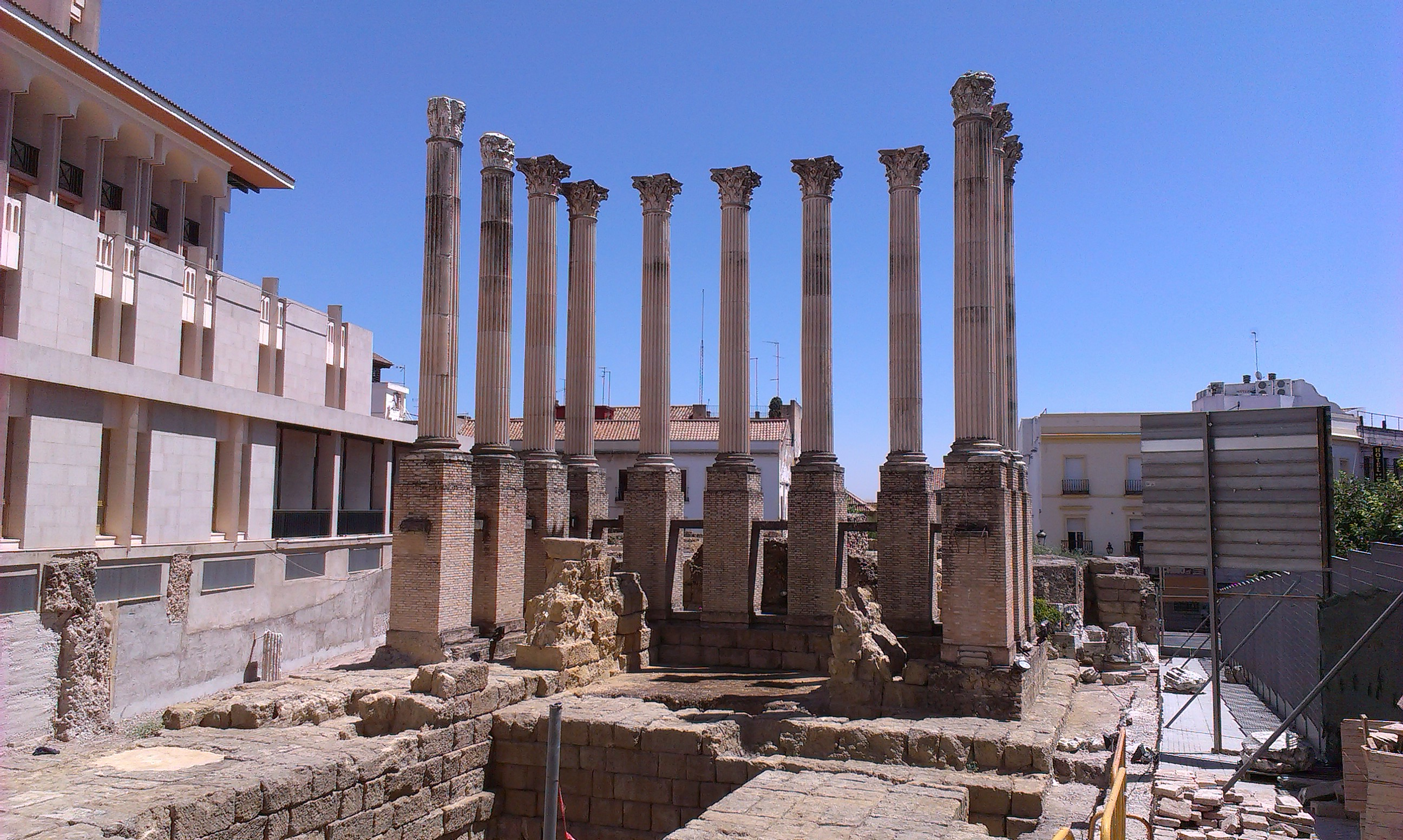
Roman Temple of Cordoba (1st century AD)

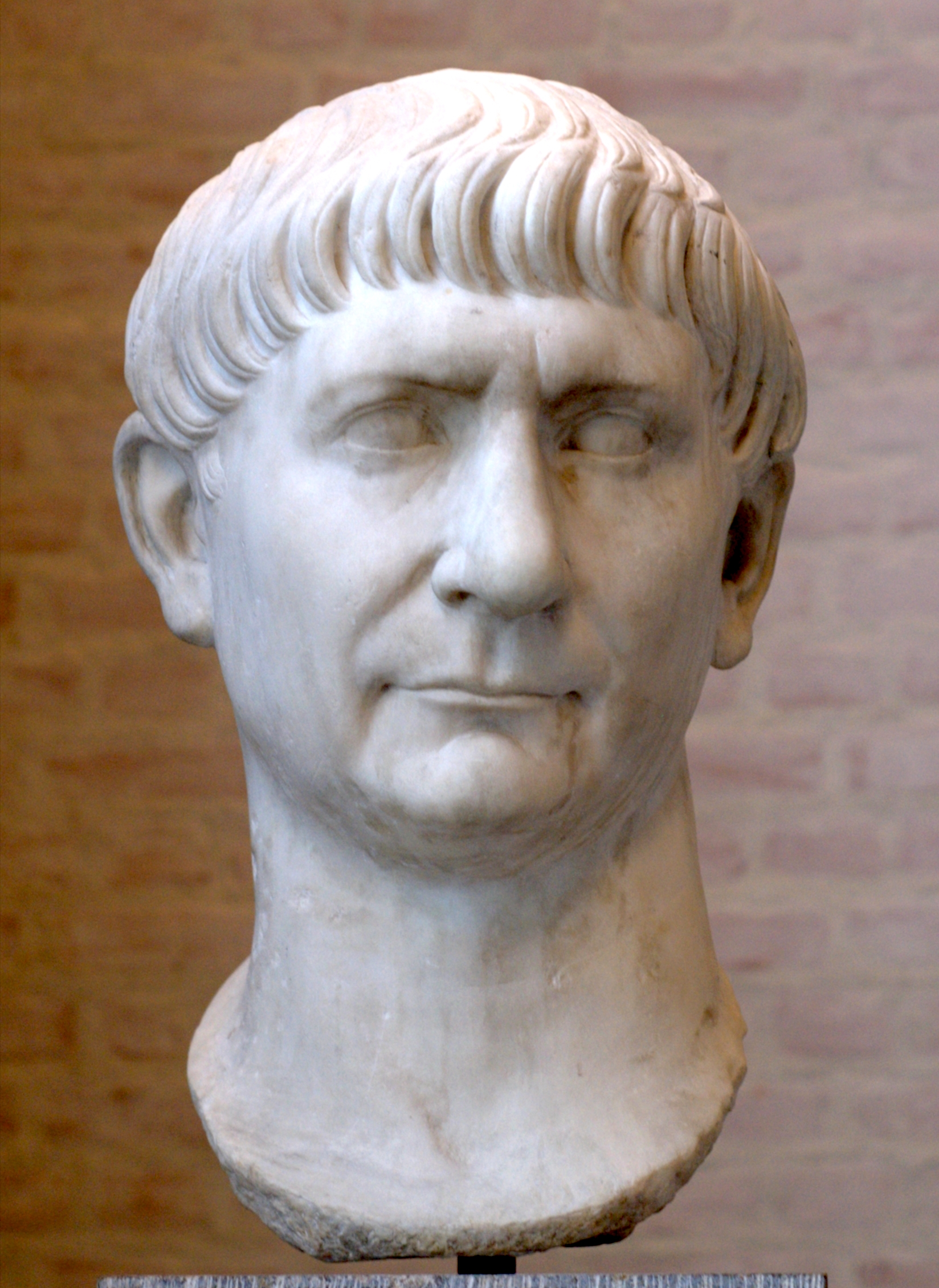
Emperor Trajan (98–117)

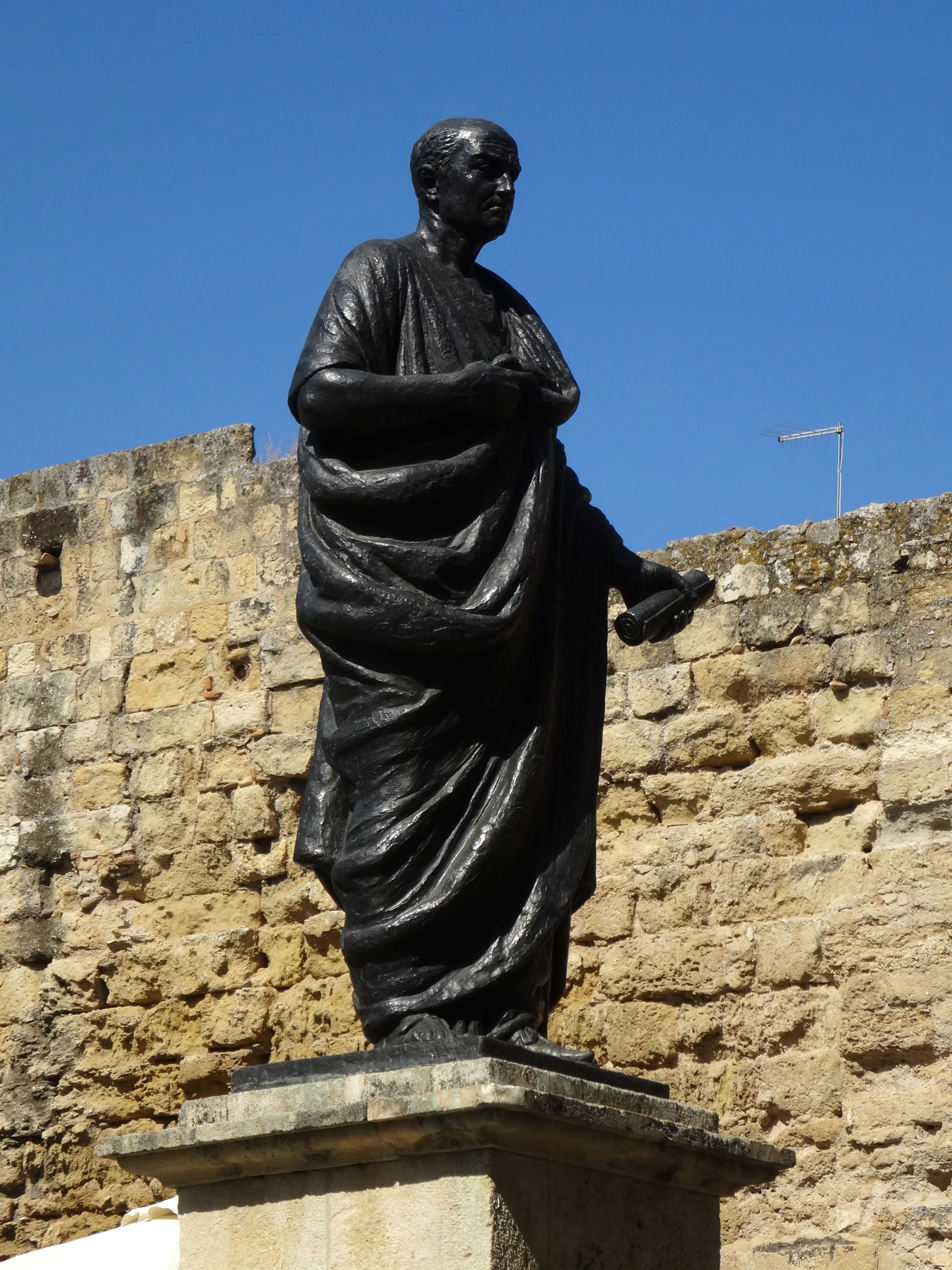
Statue of Lucius Annaeus Seneca the Younger (Córdoba)

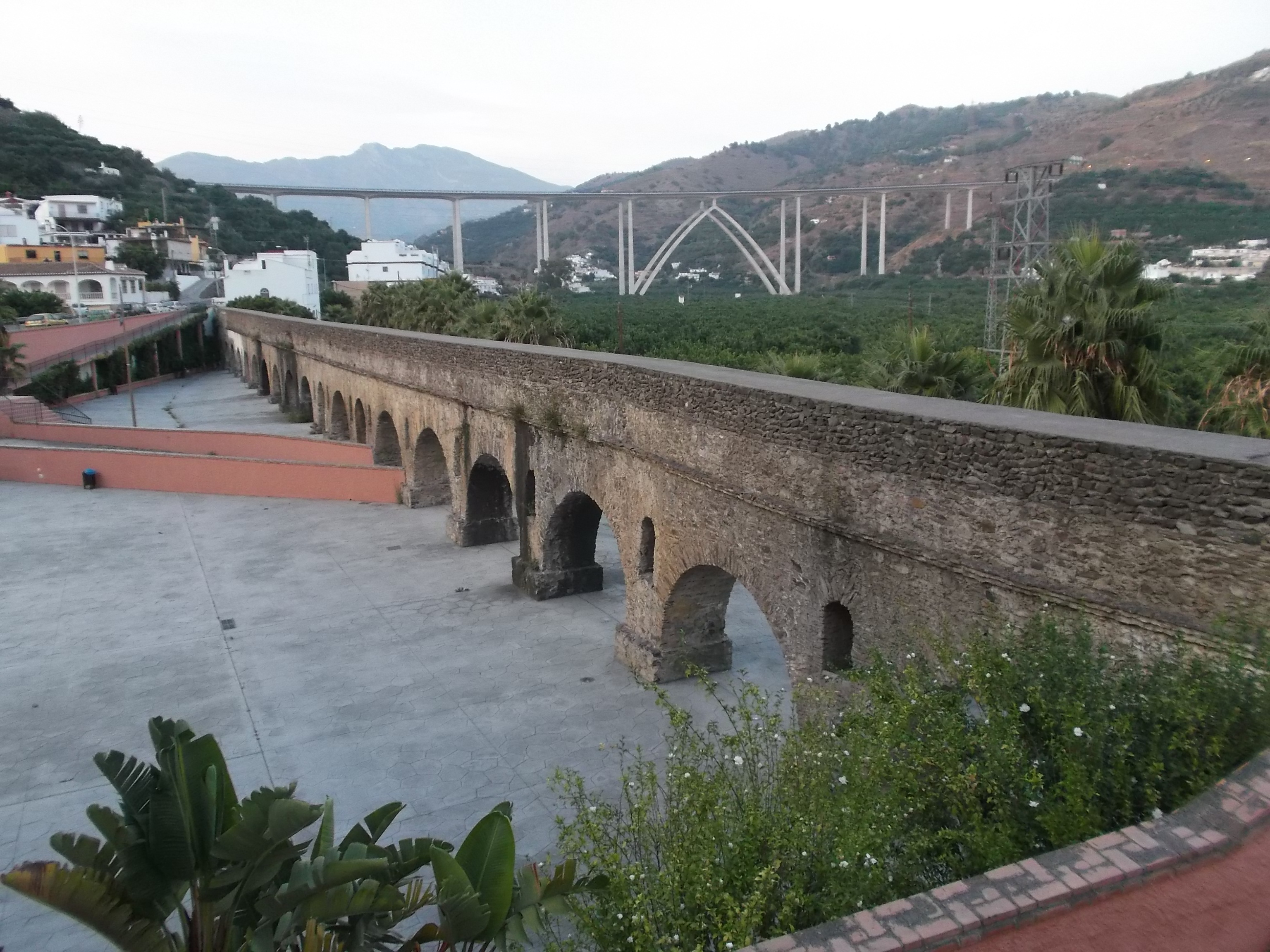
Roman Aqueduct of Almuñécar (Granada)

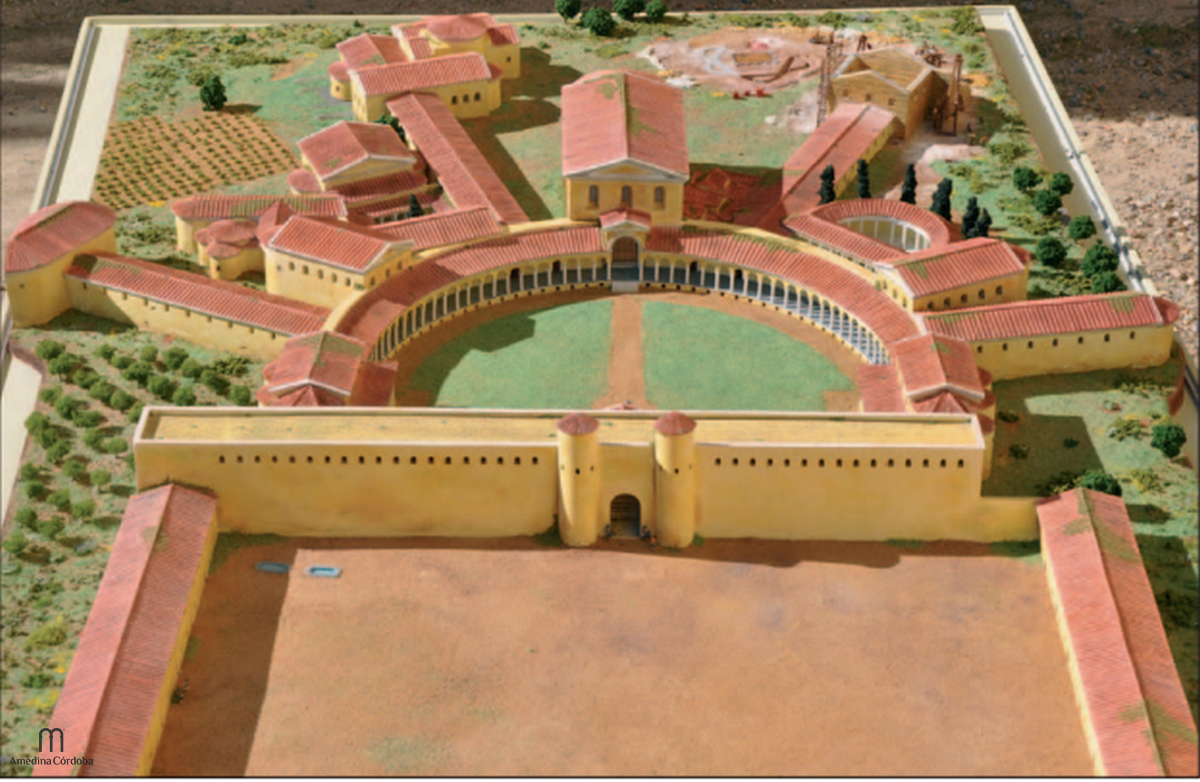
Reconstruction of Maximian's Herculean Palace in Córdoba (late-3rd century)

Hispania Baetica, often abbreviated Baetica, was one of three Roman provinces created in Hispania (the Iberian Peninsula) in 27 BC. Baetica was bordered to the west by Lusitania, and to the northeast by Tarraconensis. Baetica remained one of the basic divisions of Hispania under the Visigoths. Its territory approximately corresponds to modern Andalusia.

== Name ==
In Latin, Baetica is an adjectival form of Baetis, the Roman name for the Guadalquivir River, whose fertile valley formed one of the most important parts of the province.

== History ==
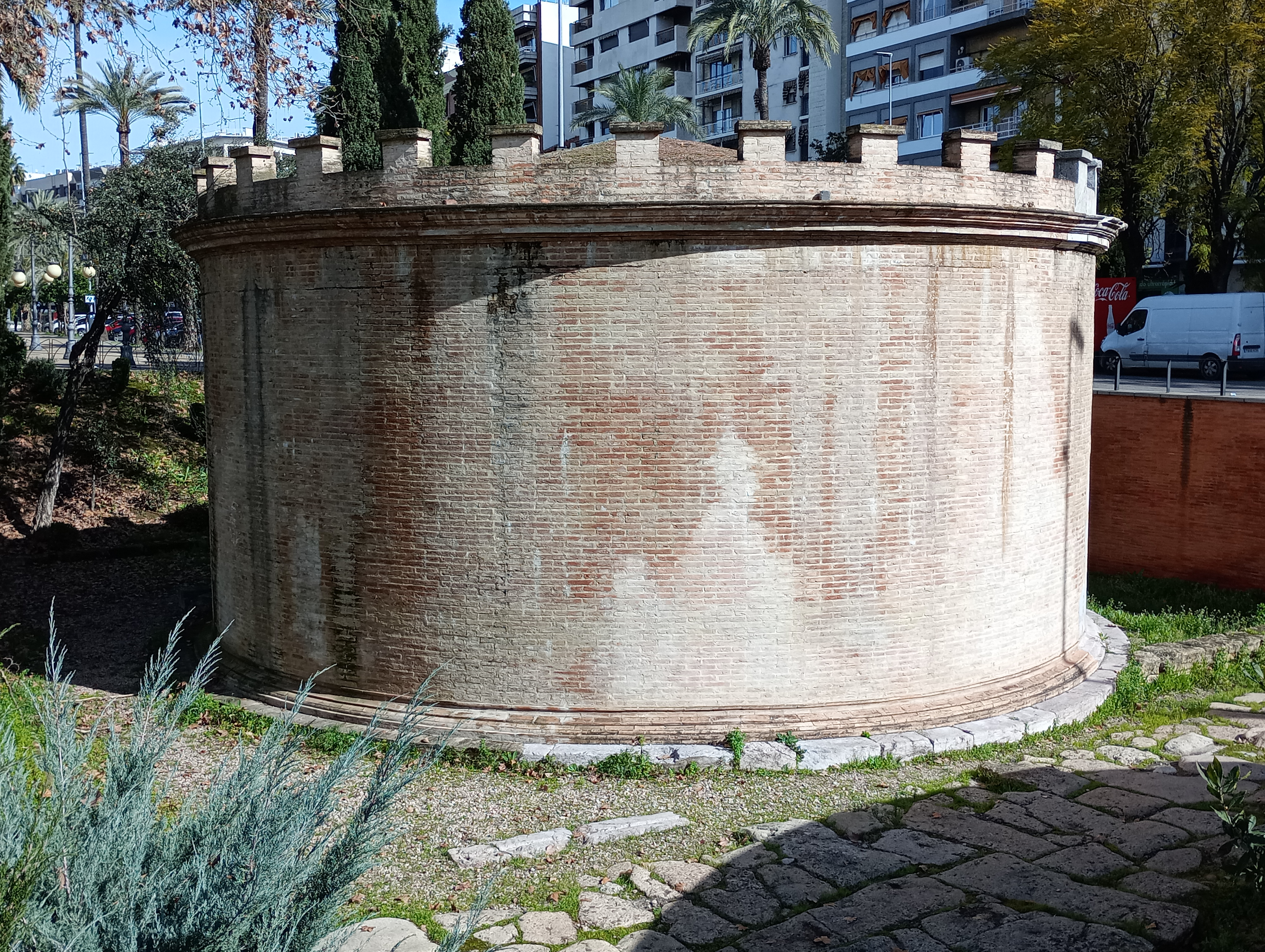
Roman Mausoleum of Cordoba (1st century AD)

Before Romanization, the mountainous area that was to become Baetica was occupied by several settled Iberian tribal groups. Celtic influence was not as strong as it was in the Celtiberian north. According to the geographer Claudius Ptolemy, the indigenes were the powerful Turdetani, in the valley of the Guadalquivir in the west, bordering on Lusitania, and the partly Hellenized Turduli with their city Baelo, in the hinterland behind the coastal Phoenician trading colonies, whose Punic inhabitants Ptolemy termed the "Bastuli". Phoenician Gadir (Cádiz) was on an island against the coast of Hispania Baetica. Other important Iberians were the Bastetani, who occupied the Almería and mountainous Granada regions. Towards the southeast, Punic influence spread from the Carthaginian cities on the coast: New Carthage (Roman Carthago Nova, modern Cartagena), Abdera and Malaca (Málaga).

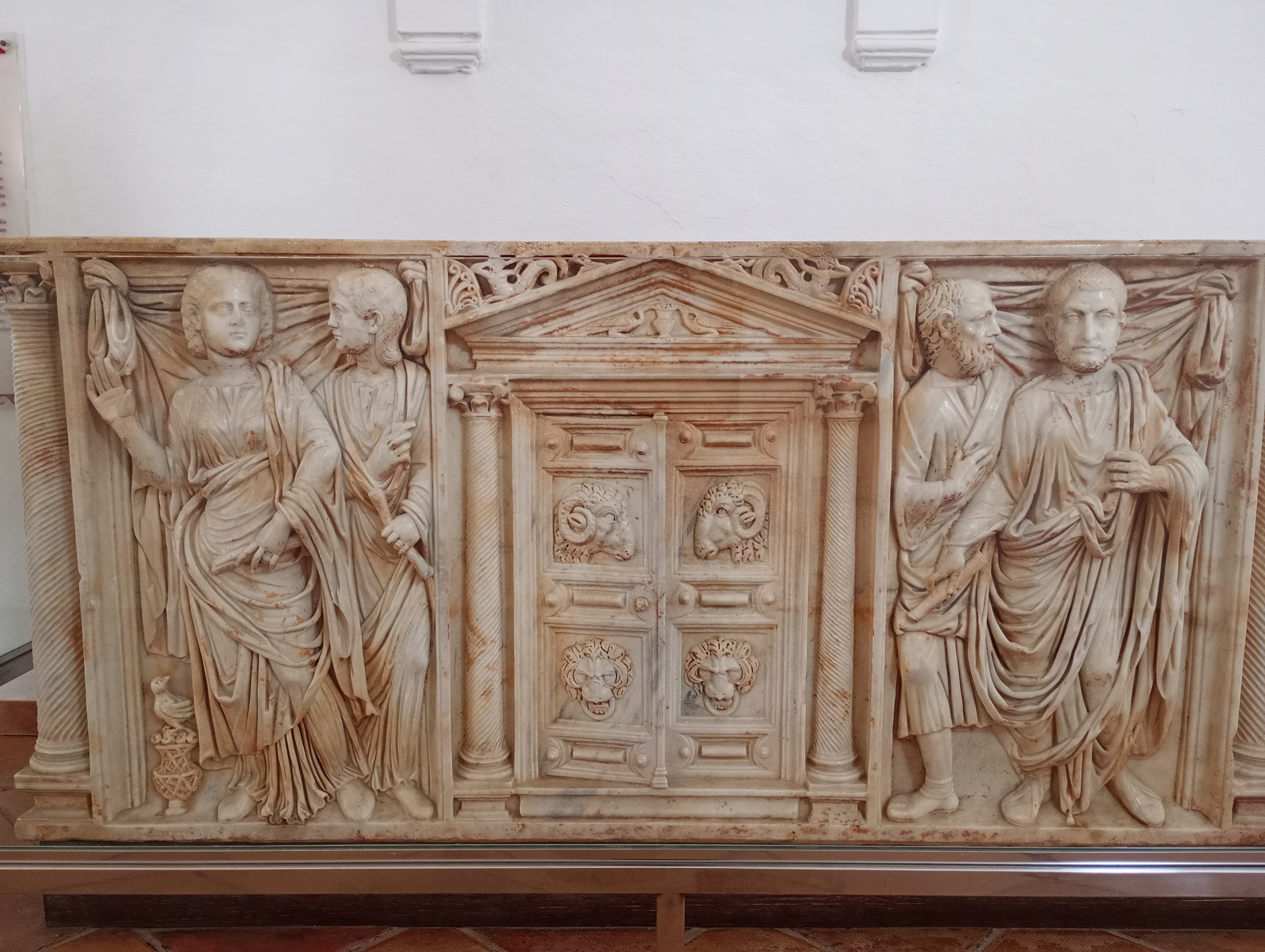
Roman Sarcophagus (3rd century AD), Cordoba

Some of the Iberian cities retained their pre-Indo-European names in Baetica throughout the Roman era. Granada was called Eliberri, Illiberis and Illiber by the Romans; in Basque, "iri-berri" or "ili-berri", still signifies "new town".

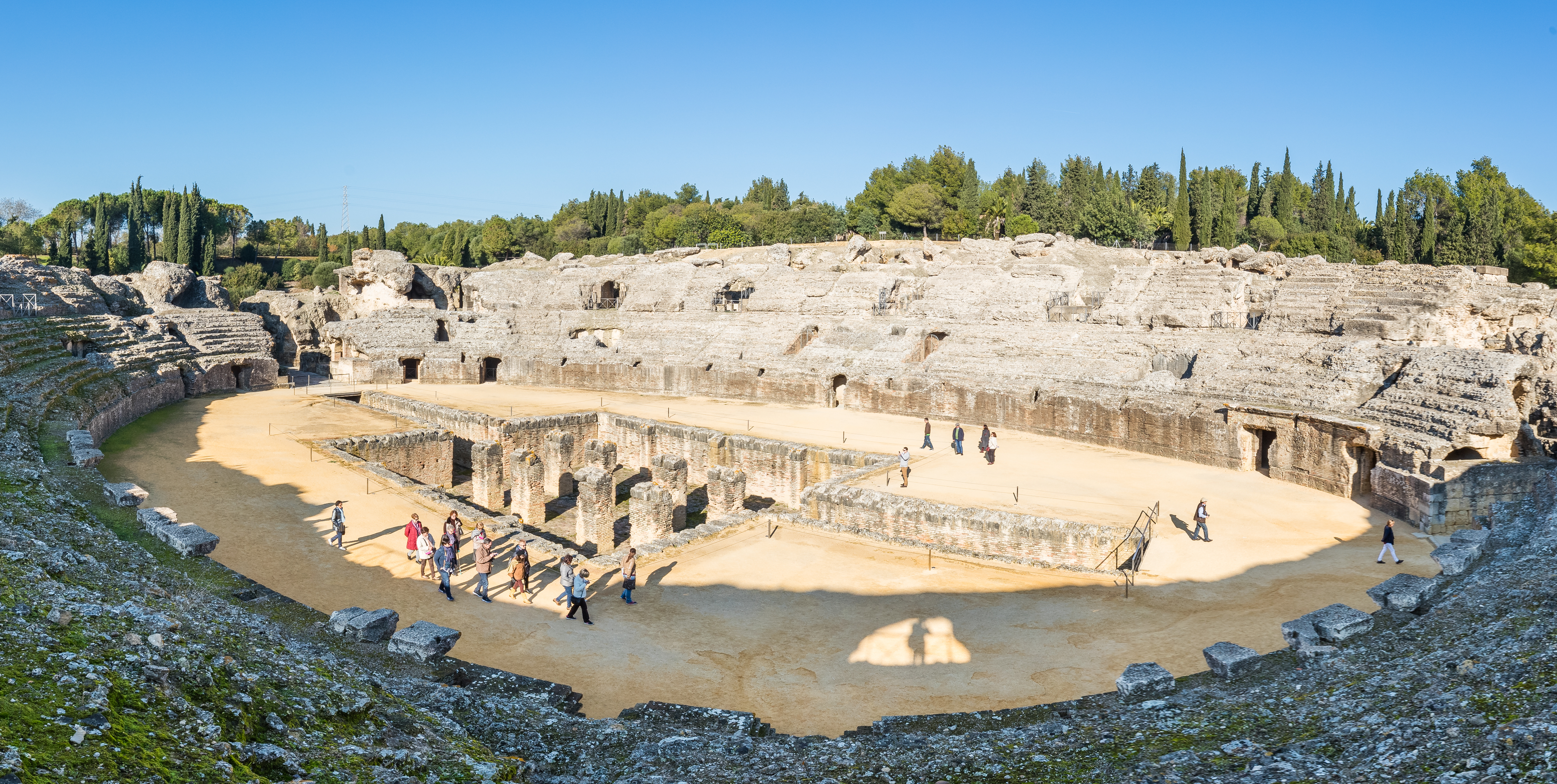
Amphitheatre of Itálica, Seville (2nd century AD)

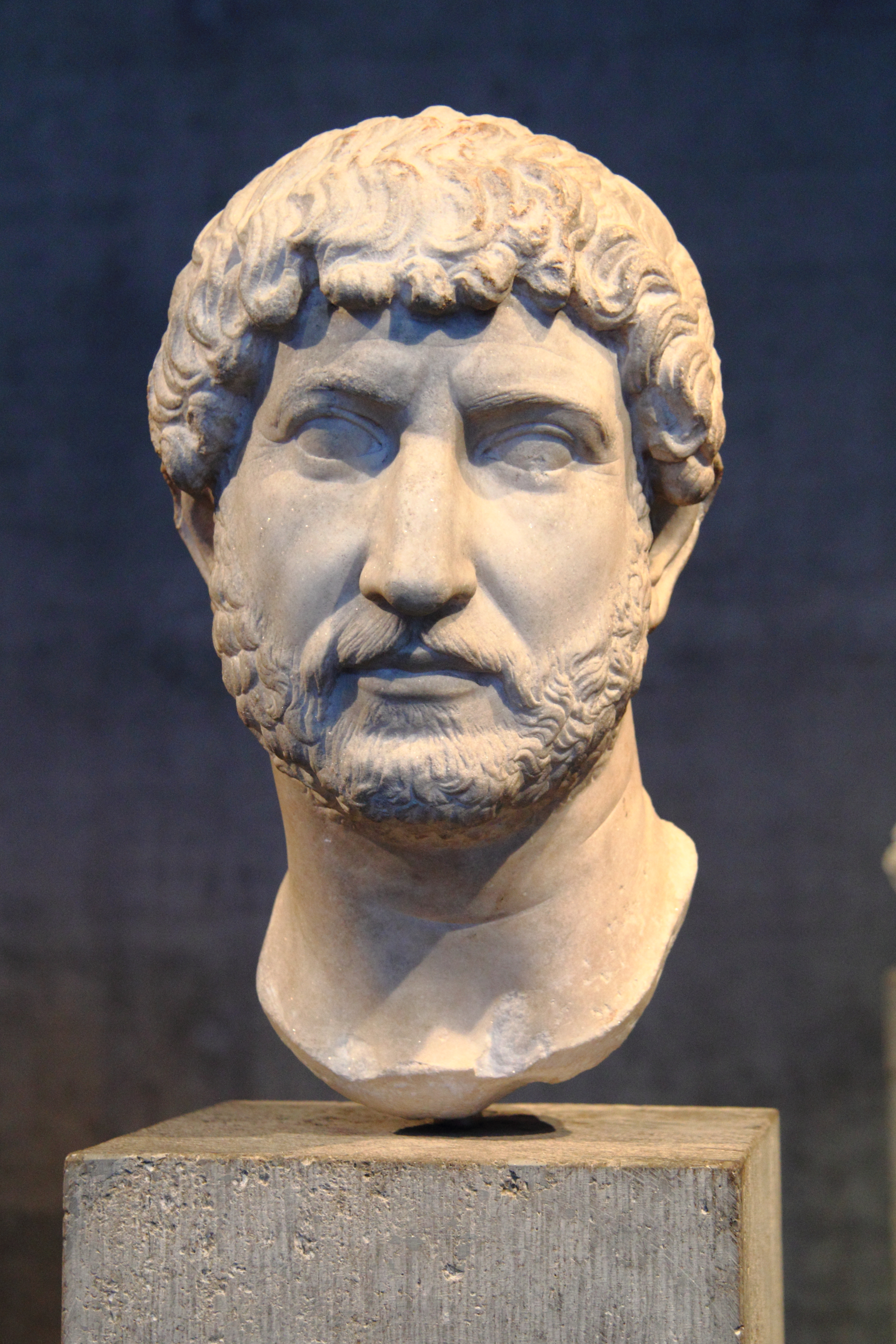
Emperor Hadrian (117–138)

The south of the Iberian peninsula was agriculturally rich, providing for export of wine, olive oil and the fermented fish sauce called garum that were staples of the Mediterranean diet, and its products formed part of the western Mediterranean trade economy even before it submitted to Rome in 206 BC. After the defeat of Carthage in the Second Punic War, which found its casus belli on the coast of Baetica at Saguntum, Hispania was significantly Romanized in the course of the 2nd century BC, following the uprising initiated by the Turdetani in 197. The central and north-eastern Celtiberians soon followed suit. It took Cato the Elder, who became consul in 195 BC and was given the command of the whole peninsula to put down the rebellion in the northeast and the lower Ebro valley. He then marched southwards and put down a revolt by the Turdetani. Cato returned to Rome in 194, leaving two praetors in charge of the two Iberian provinces. In the late Roman Republic, Hispania remained divided like Gaul into a "Nearer" and a "Farther" province, as experienced marching overland from Gaul: Hispania Citerior (the Ebro region), and Ulterior (the Guadalquivir region). The battles in Hispania during the 1st century BC were largely confined to the north.

In the reorganization of the Empire in 14 BC, Baetica was made a senatorial province, which means it was governed by a proconsul who had formerly been a praetor appointed by the Senate. Its capital was Colonia Patricia Corduba (modern day Córdoba), founded in 169 BC. Fortune smiled on rich Baetica, which was Baetica Felix, and a dynamic, upwardly-mobile social and economic middling stratum developed there, which absorbed freed slaves and far outnumbered the rich elite. The Senatorial province of Baetica became so secure that no Roman legion was required to be permanently stationed there, whereas Legio VII Gemina was permanently stationed to the north, in Hispania Tarraconensis, in a camp which later became the city of León.

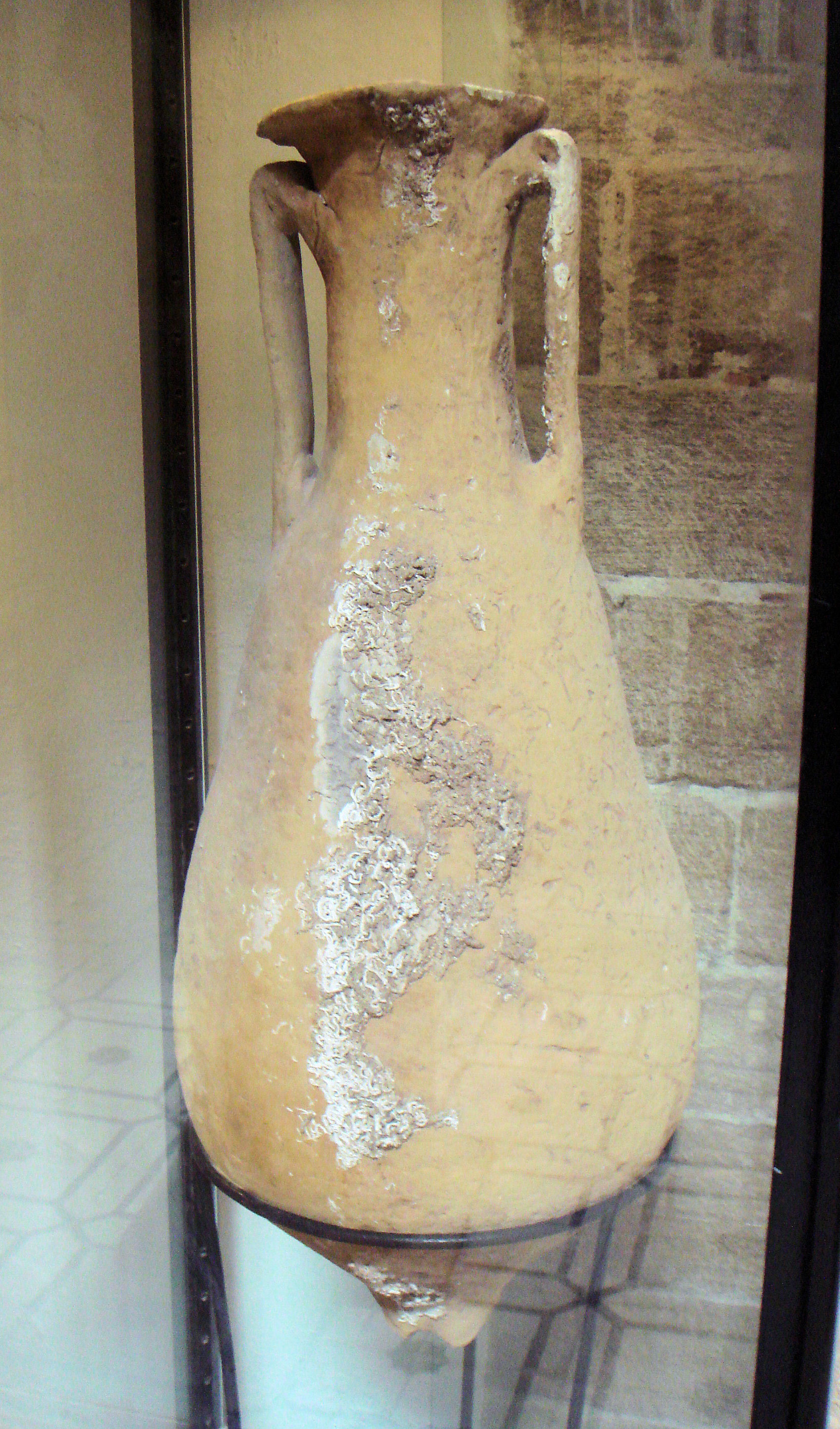
Betica amphora found in Essaouira, 1–2nd century AD

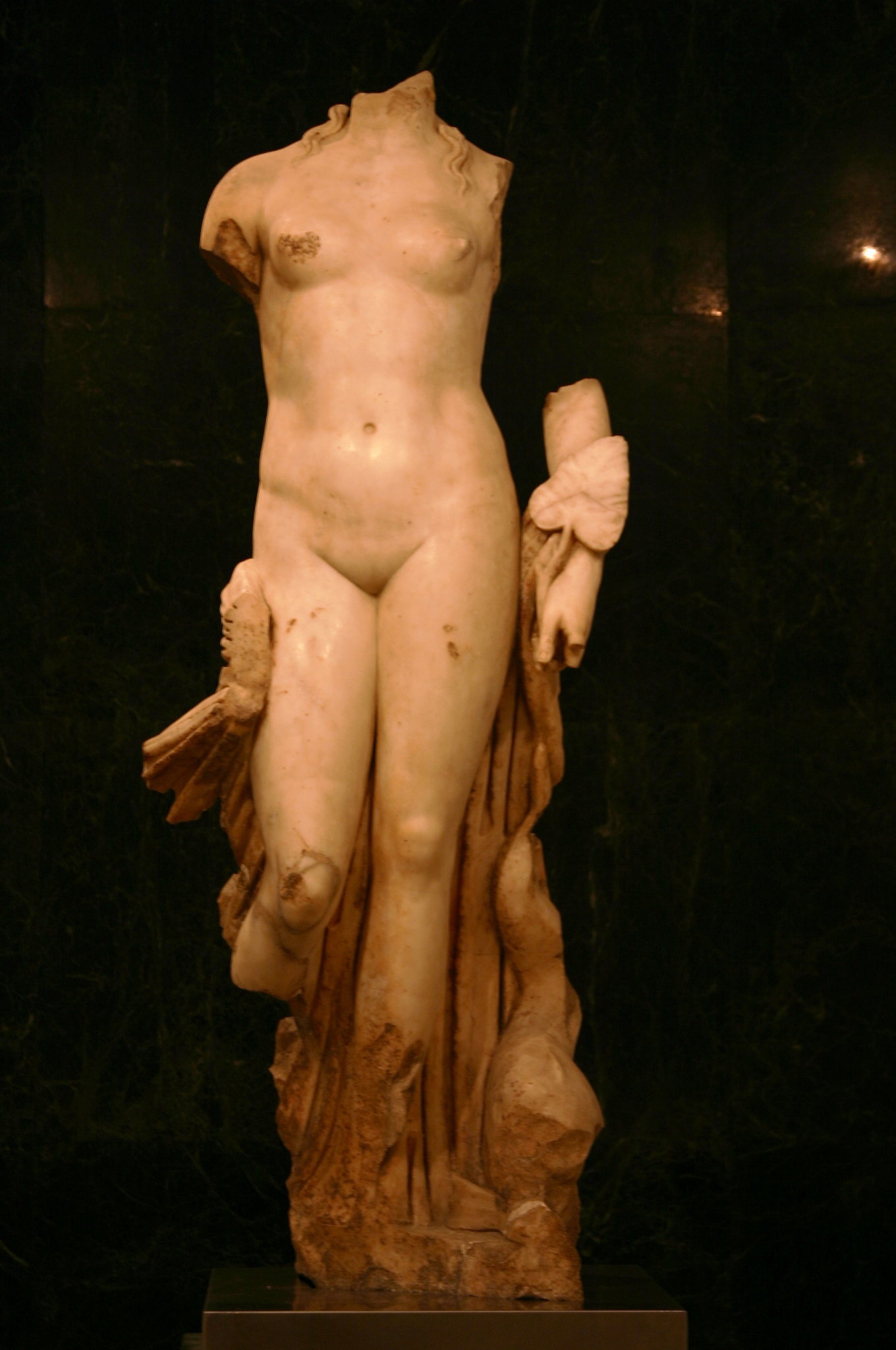
Venus of Itálica, Seville (2nd century AD)

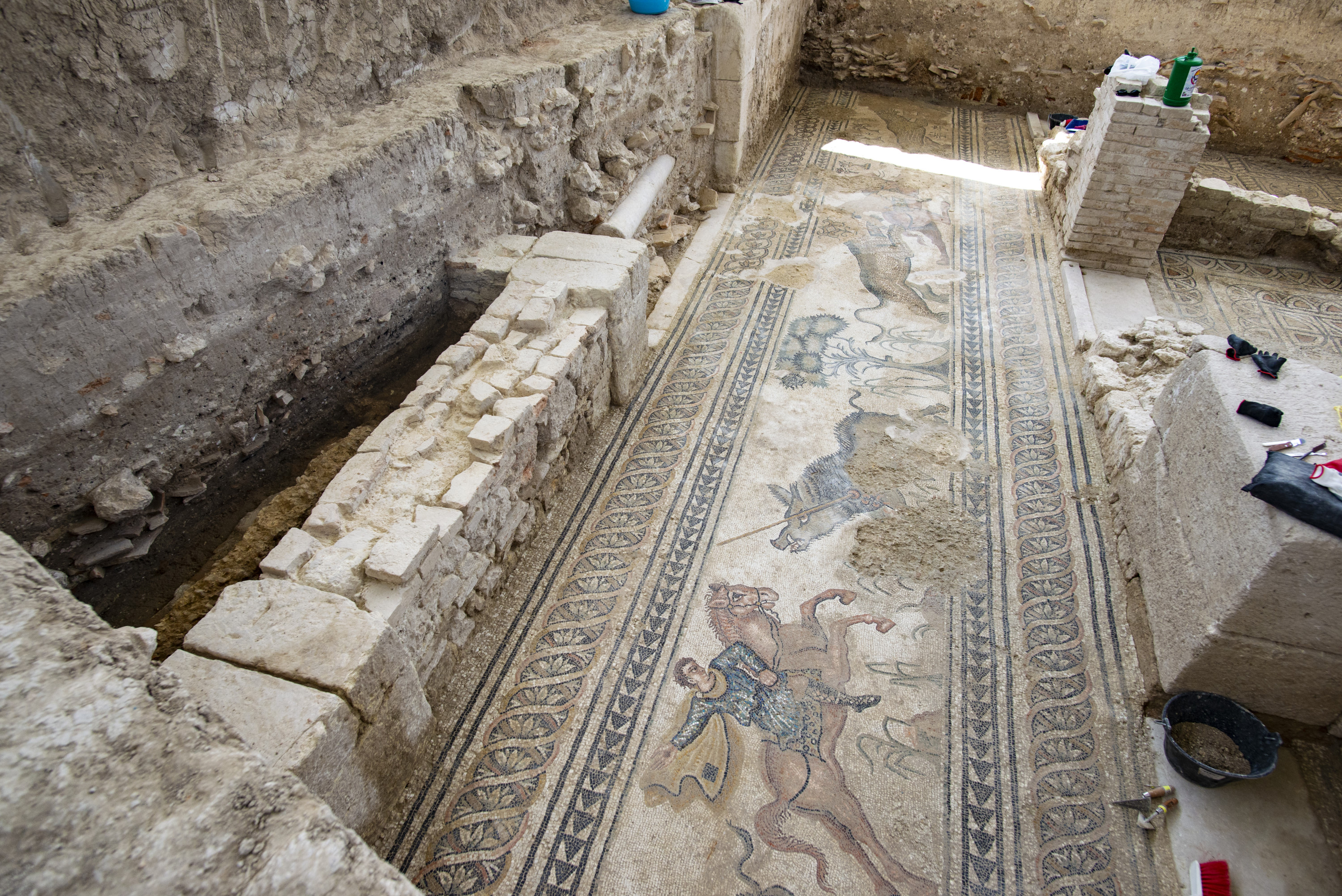
Mosaic of the Roman villa of Salar (Granada)

Baetica was divided into four conventūs, which were territorial divisions like judicial circuits, where the chief men met together at major centers, at fixed times of year, under the eye of the proconsul, to oversee the administration of justice: the conventus Gaditanus (of Gades, or Cádiz), Cordubensis (of Cordoba), Astigitanus (of Astigi, or Écija), and Hispalensis (of Hispalis, or Seville). As the towns became the permanent seats of standing courts during the later Empire, the conventūs were superseded (Justinian's Code, i.40.6) and the term conventus is lastly applied to certain bodies of Roman citizens living in a province, forming a sort of enfranchised corporation, and representing the Roman people in their district as a kind of gentry; and it was from among these that proconsuls generally took their assistants. So in spite of some social upsets, as when Septimius Severus put to death a number of leading Baetians— including women — the elite in Baetica remained a stable class for centuries.

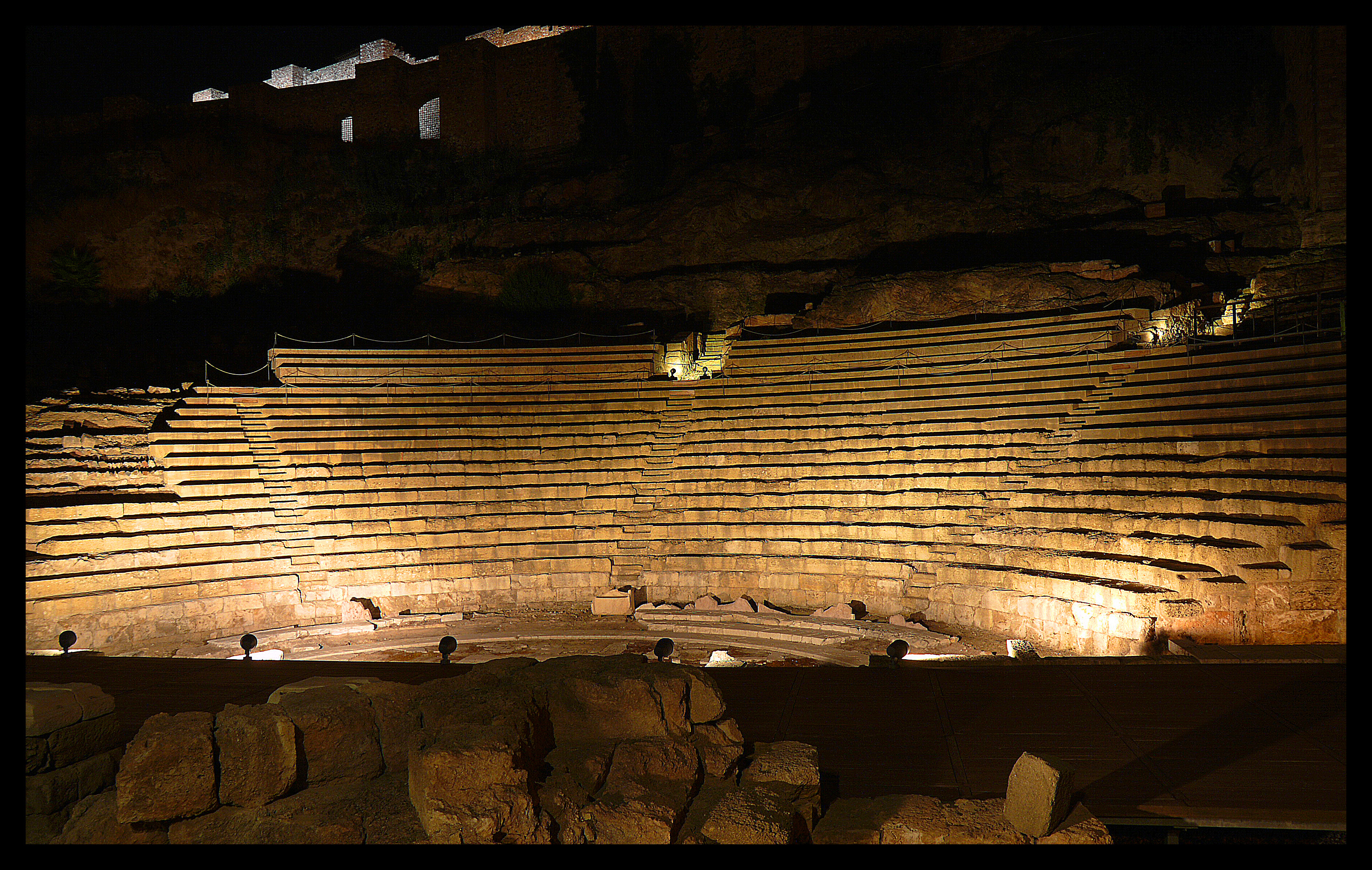
Roman Theatre of Málaga (1st century AD)

Columella, who wrote a twelve volume treatise on all aspects of Roman farming and knew viticulture, came from Gades (Cádiz). The vast olive plantations of Baetica shipped olive oil from the coastal ports by sea to supply Roman legions in Germania and general demand elsewhere in the empire. Amphoras from Baetica have been found everywhere in the Western Roman Empire. It was to keep Roman legions supplied by sea routes that the Empire needed to control the distant coasts of Lusitania and the northern Atlantic coast of Hispania.

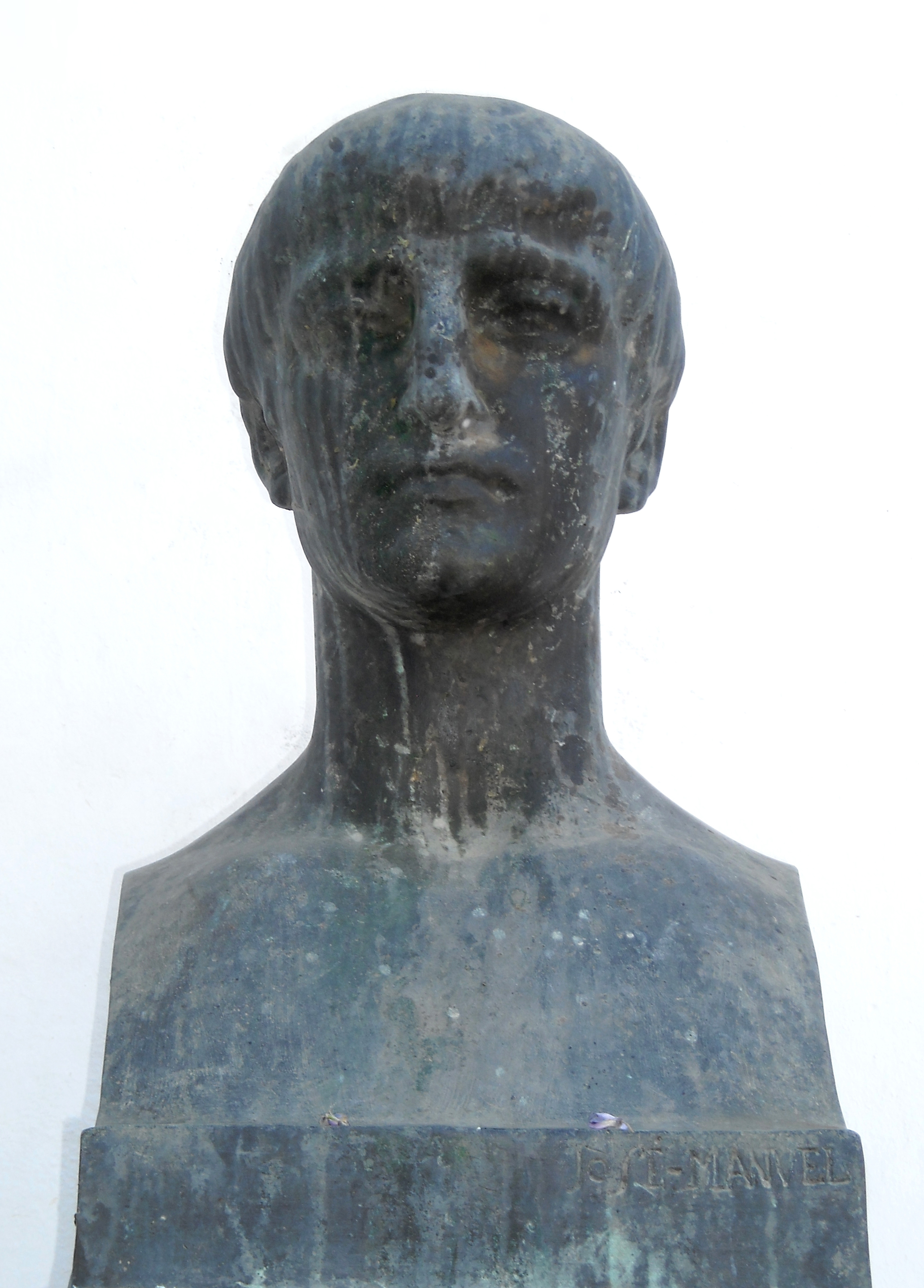
Bust of Marcus Annaeus Lucanus "Lucan" (Córdoba)

Baetica was rich and strongly Romanized, attracting colonists and merchants from Italy. Since the 1st century BC it produced outstanding figures like the aforementioned Columella, the rhetorician Seneca the Elder, his son the stoic philosopher Seneca the Younger, and Lucan, author of the epic poem Pharsalia on Caesar's civil war against Pompey the Great. The last three were members of the Annaea family, a prominent Roman gens settled in Córdoba. Facts that the Emperor Vespasian was rewarding when he granted the Ius latii that extended the rights pertaining to Roman citizenship (latinitas) to the inhabitants of Hispania, an honor that secured the loyalty of the Baetian elite and its middle class.

Baetica also gave Rome two emperors. Trajan, the first emperor since Claudius to be of provincial birth, though of Italic stock, was born in Itálica (Baetica), a colony established in 206 BC by Scipio Africanus for Roman veterans of the Second Punic War. Trajan's kinsman and successor Hadrian also came from Itálica. Marcus Aurelius, though born in Rome, had ancestors born in the town of Ucubi (modern day Espejo), a Roman colony not far from Córdoba.

Baetica enjoyed Pax Romana for most of imperial history, though it faced a permanent threat stemming from Africa from the 2nd century AD. On 171 groups of mauri (natives of Mauretania Tingitana, roughly modern day Morocco) crossed the Strait of Gibraltar and looted rural towns for months until they were expelled. A century later, in 296–297, Emperor Maximian built a massive palace nearby Córdoba from where to command the campaign against piracy in the Strait and Berber incursions in Mauritania.

At the beginning of the 5th century, Baetica was hit hard by the Roman Civil War (407-415), which was initiated by the usurper Constantine III. The situation deteriorated in 409 with the arrival of peoples such as the Vandals, Suebi and the Alans who invaded Hispania. The period after that was marked by a series of wars against the Vandals and Suebi in which Rome tried to maintain its power. The Roman army then rely heavily on the deployment of Gothic foederati. From 460 the Roman power was on its return. Under King Euric the Visigoths became the dominant factor in the region, although a definitive kingdom in Hispania was only founded by his successor Alaric II.

The province formed part of the Exarchate of Africa and was joined to Mauretania Tingitana after Belisarius' reconquest of Africa. The Catholic bishops of Baetica, solidly backed by their local population, were able to convert the Arian Visigoth king Reccared and his nobles. As an administrative unit, Baetica ceased to exist after the Islamic invasion in 711.

== Proconsuls ==
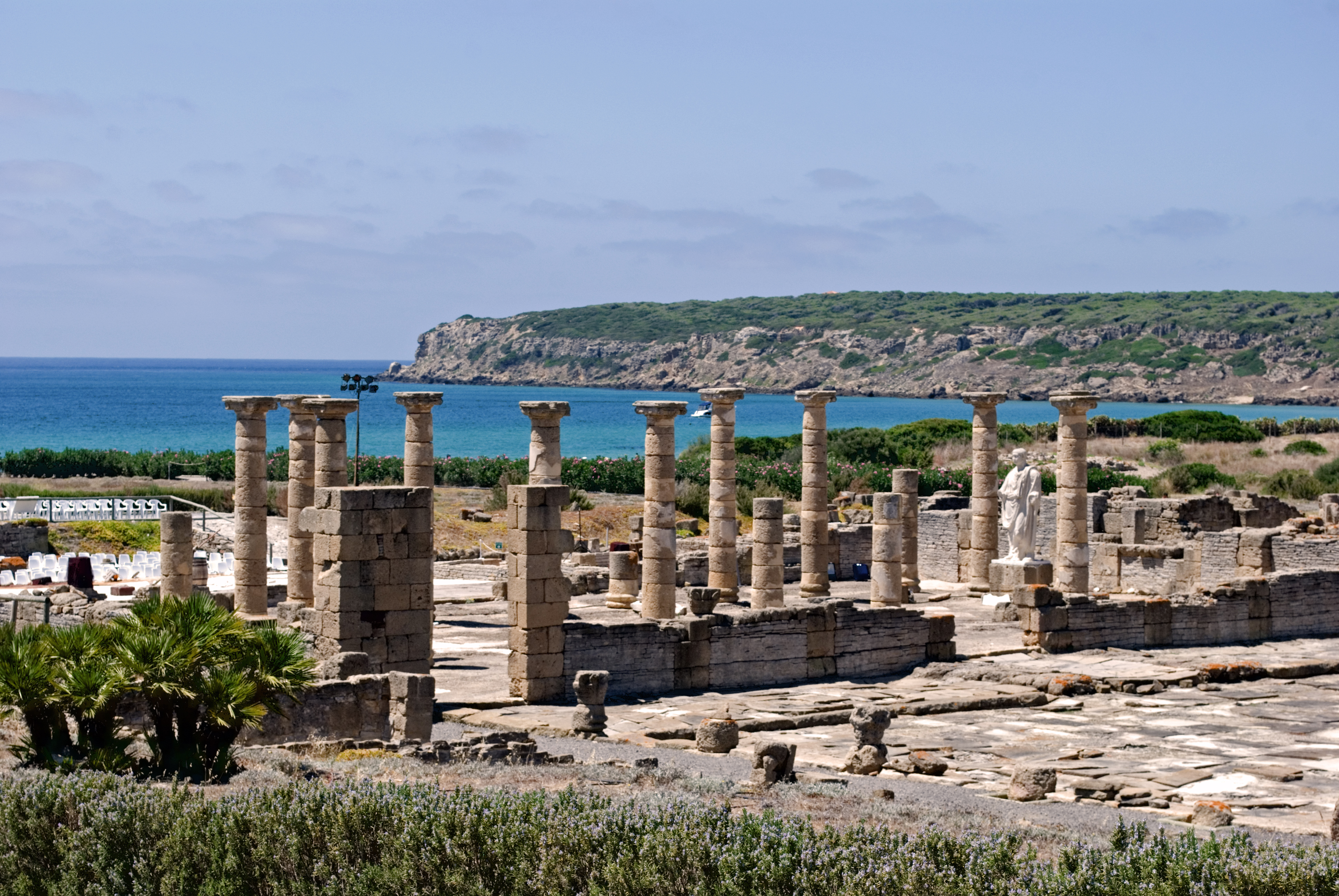
Baelo Claudia (Cádiz)

The Province was governed by a proconsul who had formerly been a praetor.

Proconsuls	Term start	Term end
Gaius Vibius Serenus	20 AD	22 AD
Gaius Caetronius Miccio	c. 37 AD	c. 38 AD
Umbonĭus Silĭo	43 AD	44 AD
Marcus Ulpius Traianus	?	Before 67 AD
Lucius Lucullus	70s AD	70s AD
[? Marcus] Sempronius Fuscus	78 AD	79 AD
Gaius Cornelius Gallicanus	79 AD	80 AD
Lucius Antistius Rusticus	83 AD	84 AD
Baebius Massa	91 AD	92 AD
Galeo Tettienus Severus Marcus Eppuleius Proculus Tiberius Caepio Hispo	95 AD	96 AD
? Gallus	96 AD	97 AD
Gaius Caecilius Classicus	97 AD	98 AD
Quintus Baebius Macer	100 AD	101 AD
Instanius Rufus	101 AD	102 AD
? Lustricius Bruttianus	Before 107 AD	Before 107 AD
[? Titus] Calestrius Tiro	107 AD	108 AD
Egnatius Taurinus	between 138 AD and 143 AD	between 138 AD and 143 AD
? Gaius Julius Proculus	122 AD	123 AD
Publius Tullius Varro	123 AD	124 AD
Lucius Flavius Arrianus	before 129 AD	before 129 AD
Gaius Javolenus Calvinus	between 138 AD and 143 AD	between 138 AD and 143 AD
Aelius Marcianus	between 138 AD and 161 AD	between 138 AD and 161 AD
Publius Statius Paullus Postumus Junior	middle of the 2nd century	middle of the 2nd century
Publius Cornelius Anullinus	170 AD	171 AD
Gaius Aufidius Victorinus	171 AD	171 AD
Gaius Memmius Fidus Julius Albius	183 AD	183 AD
Caecilius Aemilianus	215 AD	215 AD
Aulus Caecina Tacitus	first half 3rd century	first half 3rd century
L. Sempronius O[...] Celsus [Servi]lius Fabianus	first half 3rd century	first half 3rd century
Quintus Pomponius Munat[ianus?] Clodianus	first half 3rd century	first half 3rd century

== See also ==
- Pre-Roman peoples of the Iberian Peninsula
- Romanization of Hispania
- Spania
