= Decurion (Roman cavalry officer) =

Leader of ten legionaries

A decurion (Latin: decurio; pl.: decuriones) was a Roman cavalry officer in command of a squadron (turma) of cavalrymen in the Roman army.

== Republican army ==
During the Roman Republic a "Polybian" legion (c. 300–88 BC) of citizen-levies had a cavalry complement of 300 horse, divided into 10 turmae (squadrons) of 30 men each. Each turma was led by three decurions, who were elected by the squadron members themselves. Although decurio (lit. 'leader of ten men'), it does not appear that a turma was sub-divided into three troops of ten men each. Instead, one decurion would act as squadron commander and the other two as his deputies.

== Imperial army ==
In the Imperial Roman army of the Principate (30 BC – AD 284), a decurion also commanded a cavalry turma of c. 30 men, but now without colleagues. In common with all soldiers in the imperial army, decurions were long-service professionals, the majority volunteers.

A Roman imperial legion, which contained c. 5,600 men, contained a small cavalry arm of just 120 men (i.e., four turmae). Since the average number of legions deployed was c. 30, imperial legionary cavalry numbered only c. 3,600, out of a total of c. 80,000 cavalrymen deployed by the imperial army. There were thus c. 120 cavalry decurions in the legions at any given time.

The vast majority of the imperial cavalry was in the regiments of the auxilia, the non-citizen corps of the regular imperial army (whose recruits were mainly imperial subjects who did not hold Roman citizenship (known as peregrini)). An ala (lit. 'wing'), which was an elite all-cavalry regiment, contained 480 horse (16 turmae, thus 16 decurions). A double-strength ala (ala milliaria) contained 720 horse (24 turmae). c. 90 alae were deployed in the time of emperor Hadrian (ruled 117–138). In addition, the auxiliary corps included a type of regiment known as a cohors equitata, an infantry unit with a cavalry complement of 120 horse (4 turmae; 8 in a double-strength unit). Around 180 such regiments existed under Hadrian. There were thus c. 2,500 decurions serving in the auxilia at any given time.

In the imperial period, decurions were no longer conscripted Romans, commoners who were often promoted from the ranks, but could also be members of native tribal aristocracies. (Roman knights at this stage only provided the overall commanders (praefecti) of the auxiliary regiments.) Thus, decurions in the imperial army were of far lower social status than their predecessors in the Republican cavalry. The latter were not only Roman citizens, but also aristocrats, whereas auxiliary decurions were mostly commoners and non-citizens (until AD 212, when all imperial subjects were granted citizenship). Even if they belonged to a native aristocracy, they ranked lower than a commoner Roman citizen in the status-conscious Roman empire.

== Literature ==
- Dobson, B (2014). "Decurio". Decurio. The Encyclopedia of Ancient History. doi:10.1002/9781444338386.wbeah19058. ISBN 9781444338386.
