= Titus Tettienus Serenus =

Roman senator

Titus Tettienus Serenus was Roman senator of the first century. He was suffect consul in the nundinium of July to August AD 81 as the colleague of Gaius Scoedius Natta Pinarius. Serenus is primarily known from inscriptions.

He is identified as the brother of Galeo Tettienus Petronianus, suffect consul in 76. No inscription bearing his entire cursus honorum has yet been identified. The only office Serenus is known to have held is governor of the imperial province of Gallia Lugdunensis, which Werner Eck has dated from the year 78 to the year 80, prior to his consulship.

However, the priesthoods he held are somewhat better known. An inscription found in Rome attests Serenus had been co-opted into the Sodales Augustales in the year 92. Another inscription from Rome, dated 24 May 102, attests that Serenus was a member of the College of Pontiffs, one of the four most prestigious priesthoods of ancient Rome, by that date. The inscription that records his co-option into the Sodales Augustales also records that another person was co-opted into the Sodales in his place in 114, implying he died that year.

Political offices
Preceded by Lucius Julius Vettius Paullus, and Titus Junius Montanus as suffect consuls	Suffect consul of the Roman Empire; 81 with Gaius Scoedius Natta Pinarius	Succeeded by Lucius Carminius Lusitanicus, and Marcus Petronius Umbrinus as suffect consuls
