= Marcus Aponius Saturninus =

Roman senator and provincial governor

Marcus Aponius Saturninus was a Senator of Imperial Rome, active in the latter half of the first century AD. His parents, also of senatorial rank, were wealthy and owned property in Egypt. He appears in the Acta Arvalia in the year 57 AD; classicist Ronald Syme suggests that he was made a member of the Arval Brethren due to the influence of Annaeus Seneca. Saturninus is mentioned as being present in 66 for sacrifices on the Capitol with the emperor Nero. Tacitus calls him a consul, but the date of his office is uncertain. He may have been consul in 55; Classical scholar Paul Gallivan at the University of Tasmania has argued that Saturninus was suffect consul between 63 and 66, by which time he was recorded as becoming promagister.

Saturninus served as the governor of Moesia in 69, which may have been an appointment of Galba. He repulsed the Sarmatians, who had invaded the province, and was in consequence rewarded by a triumphal statue at the commencement of Otho's reign.

== In the Year of the Four Emperors ==
During the Year of the Four Emperors, Saturninus and his relative Gaius Dillius Aponianus initially supported Vitellius, to whom Saturninus wrote a letter reporting on the fomenting rebellion. Later Saturninus switched his allegiance to Vespasian, and crossed the Alps to join Marcus Antonius Primus in northern Italy. There, he tried to use the civil war as a pretext for killing a personal rival, his fellow officer Tettius Julianus. Julianus was well-liked by the soldiers, a partisan of Vespasian, and brother-in-law of Vespasian's finance minister, but nonetheless Saturninus accused him of secretly supporting Vitellius. Primus, who was anxious to obtain the supreme command, excited a mutiny of the soldiers against Saturninus, who before his change of allegiance had attempted to assassinate pro-Vespasian factions in his legion. Saturninus was compelled to flee the camp.

Saturninus' fate afterwards is uncertain. He is known to have been proconsul of Asia, and some sources date this appointment to 73/74, but Syme has pointed out some weaknesses in that argument and argued instead for a date of 67/68. Based on Syme's proposed earlier date, and the fact he last appears in the records of the Arval Brethren January 69, it is possible Saturninus died not long after taking flight.

== Saturninus and Caligula ==
Suetonius tells the story of a man named "Aponius Saturninus" during the reign of the emperor Caligula, who may be the same as this Aponius Saturninus. In this tale, Aponius became drowsy at an auction of imperial property. Caligula maliciously told the auctioneer to consider Aponius's nods of the head as bidding signals, causing the sleeping man to inadvertently purchase 13 gladiators for the astronomical sum of 9 million sesterces.
