= Aysun (given name) =

- Gender: Unisex
- Language: Turkish

Origin
- Language: Turkish
- Origin: "ay"
- Derivation: 1. "ay" 2. "sun"
- Meaning: 1. "moon" 2. a suffix

Other names
- See also: Aybike, Aybüke, Ayça, Ayda, Aydan, Ayla, Aylin, Aysel, Aysu, İlkay

Aysun (pronounced [ˈajsun]) is a common unisex Turkish given name. In Turkish, "Aysun" means "a person whose face is as beautiful as the moon."

== People ==
- Aysun, son of Sulayman al-Arabi
- Aysun Aliyeva (born 1997), Azerbaijani football player
- Aysun Boyacı (born 1972), Turkish football player, football manager and teacher
- Aysun Kayacı (born 1981), Turkish model and actress
- Aysun Özbek (born 1977), Turkish volleyball player

== Fictional characters ==
- Aysun, in Follow Kadri, Not Your Heart
