= İlkay =

- Pronunciation: Turkish: [ilˈkaj]
- Gender: Feminine, Masculine
- Language: Turkish

Origin
- Language: Turkish
- Origin: "ilk"
- Derivation: 1. "ilk" 2. "ay"
- Meaning: 1. "first", "prime" 2."moon"

Other names
- See also: Aybike, Aybüke, Ayça, Ayda, Aydan, Ayla, Aylin, Aysel, Aysu, Aysun

İlkay is a common unisex Turkish given name. "İlkay" is composed of two words: "İlk" and "Ay". In Turkish, "İlk" means "first" and/or "prime", whereas "ay" means "moon". Thus, İlkay means "First moon".

== Given name ==
- İlkay Dikmen (born 1981), Turkish female Olympian swimmer
- İlkay Durmuş (born 1994), Turkish male footballer
- İlkay Gündoğan (born 1990), German male footballer of Turkish descent
- İlkay Özdemir (born 1981), Turkish female performer of stage magic
- Ilkay Silk (born 1948), Cypriot-born British and Canadian theatre artist
