= Ayça =

- Gender: Feminine
- Language: Turkish

Origin
- Language: Turkish
- Origin: "ay"
- Derivation: "Ayça"
- Meaning: 'like moon', 'little moon' or 'crescent'

Other names
- Cognates: Aybike, Ayda, Aydan, Ayla, Aylin, Aysel, Aysu
- See also: İlkay, Tülin, Tülay

Ayça is a common feminine Turkish given name. Ayça derives from Ay (moon) and it can mean like moon, little moon or crescent.

== People called Ayça ==
- Ayça Naz İhtiyaroğlu (born 1984), a Turkish volleyball player
- Ayça Ayşin Turan, a Turkish actress
- Ayça Varlıer, a Turkish actress, singer, composer and TV presenter
