= Erendiz =

- Gender: Female

Origin
- Language: Turkish
- Meaning: "Jupiter"

Other names
- Related names: Aybüke, Aydan, Ayla, Aysel, Aysun, Aysu, Güneş

Erendiz is a feminine Turkish given name. In Turkish, "Erendiz" means "Jupiter".

== Given name ==
- Erendiz Atasü, a Turkish author
