= Aysu =

- Gender: Female

Origin
- Language: Turkish
- Meaning: A combination of words "Ay" moon and "Su" water

Other names
- Related names: Aybüke, Aydan, Ayla, Aysel, Aysun

Aysu is a feminine Turkish given name and a surname. The name is produced by using two Turkish words: Ay and Su. In Turkish, "Ay" means "Moon" and "Su" means "Water". Therefore, it means "clear/lucid as moon and water".

== Given name ==
- Aysu Bankoğlu (born 1989), Turkish politician
- Aysu Keskin (born 1990), Turkish basketball player
- Aysu Türkoğlu (born 2001), Turkish long-distance swimmer

== Surname ==
- Barış Aysu (born 1992), Turkish footballer
