= Tulay =

Tulay (Persian: طولاي), also rendered as Tiula, may refer to:

- Tulay-e Bala
- Tulay-e Pain

== See also ==
- Tülay
