= Barla (disambiguation) =

Barla is a former Roman city.

Barla may also refer to:

- British Amateur Rugby League Association, the governing body for social and recreational rugby league in the United Kingdom
- Barla (surname), a surname
- Jean-Baptiste Barla, a French botanist and mycologist

== See also ==
- Bârla
- Barlas (disambiguation)
