= Güneş =

Güneş (pronounced [ˈɟyneʃ]) is a Turkish word meaning the Sun. It is a unisex given name and a surname. Notable people with the name include:

== People ==
=== Given name ===
- Güneş Gürle (born 1975), Turkish opera singer
- Güneş Taner (born 1949), Turkish politician
- Güneş Murat Tezcür, Turkey-born American academic
- Güneş Yunus (born 1942), Turkish sports shooter

=== Surname ===
- Güneş Karabulut-Kurt Professor at Ecole Polytechnique Montreal.
- Ali Güneş (born 1978), Turkish football player
- Alpaslan Güneş (1926–death date unknown), Turkish equestrian
- Burcu Güneş (born 1975), Turkish singer
- Faik Samet Güneş (born 1993), Turkish volleyball player.
- Hasan Fehmi Güneş (1934–2021), Turkish politician
- Hatice Gunes, Turkish computer scientist
- Hurşit Güneş (born 1957), Turkish economist and politician
- Melisa Güneş (born 2001), Turkish weightlifter
- Osman Güneş (born 1952), Turkish bureaucrat
- Serdar Güneş (born 1987), Turkish football player
- Şenol Güneş (born 1952), Turkish football player
- Turan Güneş (politician) (1922–1982), Turkish politician
- Uğur Güneş (volleyballer) (born 1993), Turkish volleyball player
- Viktoriya Zeynep Güneş (born 1998), Ukraine-born Turkish swimmer
- Yeliz Güneş (born 2006), Turkish rhythmic gymnast
- Zehra Güneş (born 1999), Turkish volleyball player

== Fictional characters ==
- Güneş, in Follow Kadri, Not Your Heart

== Other uses ==
- Güneş, a Turkish newspaper
- Güneş SK, a defunct Turkish sports club of Istanbul, Turkey
