= Ayda =

Ayda (Persian: آیدا) may refer to:

- Ayda (name) (آیدا) Persian variant of the Turkish name
- Ayda, Iran, a village in Khuzestan Province, Iran
