= Legio I Illyricorum =

The Legio I Illyricorum was a Roman Legion stationed in Qasr el-Azraq and Palmyra; it is mentioned in the Notitia Dignitatum. According to ancient sources, it was stationed within the Eastern Half of the Roman Empire under emperor Aurelian.

== History ==
Legio I Illyricorum was founded by Emperor Aurelian around AD 272, recruited entirely from Danubian provincial troops to serve as a mobile field force during his campaign to reconquer the breakaway Palmyrene Empire. Following the defeat of Queen Zenobia, Aurelian permanently stationed the legion in the East to garrison Palmyra and maintain control over the desert frontier, operating out of bases including Qasr al-Azraq in modern Jordan.

During the reigns of Diocletian and Galerius, the legion was transferred to the newly constructed Camp of Diocletian in Palmyra to serve as the city's primary military headquarters. Detachments (vexillationes) of I Illyricorum saw service across the empire; under Emperor Licinius, a detachment commanded by the officer Victorinus was deployed to Egypt and Cyrene before returning to Palmyra.

Sometime during the 3rd century, a unit of Moorish cavalry associated with the legion was also reassigned to Aila (modern Eilat) to replace Legio X Fretensis. According to the late-4th century Notitia Dignitatum, Legio I Illyricorum remained active as a frontier unit (limitanei) guarding the Syrian desert under the command of the Dux Foenicis.

== Attested members ==
| Name | Rank | Time Frame | Source |
|---|---|---|---|
| Victorinus | Dux | 4th century AD | |
| Aurelius Onesimus | Legionary | 3rd century AD | |

== See also ==
- List of Roman legions
- Camp of Diocletian
