= Miss Europe 1952 =

International beauty pageant

- Date: 19 August 1952
- Venue: Naples, Italy
- Entrants: 13
- Placements: 5
- Withdrawals: Denmark; Norway; Portugal; San Marino
- Returns: England; Greece; Ireland
- Winner: Günseli Başar; Turkey

Miss Europe 1952 was the 15th edition of the Miss Europe pageant, held in Naples, Italy, on 19 August 1952. At the end of the event, Hanni Schall of Austria crowned Günseli Başar of Turkey as Miss Europe 1952.

A Miss Europe 1951 contest was supposed to be held the previous year in Cairo, Egypt. However, the contest did not push through due to undisclosed reasons.

Contestants from thirteen countries competed in this year's pageant.

== Results ==
=== Placements ===
Placement	Contestant
Miss Europe 1952	Turkey – Günseli Başar
1st runner-up	France – Nicole Drouin
2nd runner-up	Greece – Virginia Petimezaki
3rd runner-up	Germany – Vera Marks
4th runner-up	Belgium – Anne-Marie Pauwels; England – Judy Breen

== Contestants ==
=== Selection of participants ===
Contestants from thirteen countries competed in this edition. This edition saw the returns of England and Greece who last competed in 1938 and Ireland who last competed in 1949. Denmark, Norway, Portugal, and San Marino withdrew in this edition.

=== List of contestants ===
Thirteen contestants competed for the title.

Country/Territory	Contestant	Age (Note: Ages at the time of the pageant)	Hometown
Austria	Ingeborg Freuis	21	Bregenz
Belgium	Anne-Marie Pauwels	22	Ostend
England	Judy Breen	21	London
Finland	Eeva Maria Hellas	19	Helsinki
France	Nicole Drouin	23	Paris
(Kingdom of Greece) Greece	Virginia Petimezaki	19	Piraeus
Holland	Elisabeth van Proosdij	22	Amsterdam
Ireland	Eithne Dunne	–	Dublin
Italy	Fanny Landini	–	–
Sweden	Anne Marie Tistler	19	Stockholm
Switzerland	Sylvia Müller	20	Geneva
Turkey	Günseli Başar	20	Istanbul
West Germany	Vera Marks	18	Frankfurt

== Miss Casino 1952 ==
Miss Casino 1952
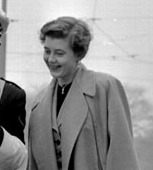
- Judy Breen
- Date: 22 February 1952
- Venue: Amsterdam, Netherlands
- Entrants: 10
- Placements: 5
- Debuts: Austria; Belgium; Cannes (France); Germany; Great Britain; Holland; Seville (Spain)
- Withdrawals: Bulgaria; England; Italy; Monaco; Overseas France
- Winner: Judy Breen; Great Britain

Miss Casino 1952 was the second edition of the Miss Europe pageant organized by the "Comité Officiel et International Miss Europe", held in Amsterdam, Netherlands, on 22 February 1952. At the end of the event, Judy Breen of Great Britain was crowned as Miss Casino Amsterdam-1952.

Contestants from ten countries competed in this year's pageant.

=== Placements ===
Placement	Contestant
Miss Europa 1952	Great Britain – Judy Breen
1st runner-up	Sweden – Anita Ekberg
2nd runner-up	Holland – Elisabeth van Proosdij
3rd runner-up	Austria – Ingeborg Freuis
4th runner-up	Belgium – Andrea Bouillon

=== List of contestants ===
Ten contestants competed for the title.

Country/Territory	Contestant	Age	Hometown
Austria	Ingeborg Freuis	21	Bregenz
Belgium	Andrea Bouillon	–	Charleroi
Cannes (France)	Denis le Mentec	–	Cannes
Denmark	Eve Flandrake	–	Copenhagen
Germany	Vera Marks	18	Frankfurt
Great Britain	Judy Breen	21	London
Holland	Elisabeth van Proosdij	21	Amsterdam
Seville (Spain)	Anita Villa	21	Seville
Sweden	Anita Ekberg	20	Malmö
Switzerland	Molly Bruderer	–	–
