= Barlas (given name) =

- Gender: Male
- Language: Turkish

Origin
- Origin: Turkish
- Meaning: 1. "hero","brave" 2. "chivalrous" 3. "warrior"
- Region of origin: Turkish

Other names
- Related names: Barış

Barlas is a common masculine Turkish given name. In Turkish, "Barlas" means "hero", "brave", "chivalrous" and/or "warrior". It is also the name of one of the later Turkicized Mongol confederations (Barlas) in Central Asia, which was the chief tribe of the Timurids.

== Given name ==
- Barlas Erinç, Turkish musician, rock singer and songwriter

== See also ==
- Barlas (surname)
