= Barış =

Barış is a Turkish word meaning "peace" and a unisex name. The name is rarely given to females, with an overwhelming majority of people having the name being males. Notable people named Barış include:

== Given name ==
- Barış Akarsu (1979–2007), Turkish rock musician
- Barış Arduç (born 1987), Turkish actor
- Barış Aysu (born 1992), Turkish footballer
- Barış Başdaş (born 1990), Turkish football player
- Barış Bektaş (born 1976), Turkish politician
- Barış Çin (born 1975), Turkish carom and artistic billiards player
- Barış Ekincier (born 1999), Azerbaijani footballer
- Barış Ermiş (born 1985), Turkish basketball player
- Barış Esen (born 1986), Turkish chess grandmaster
- Barış Hamaz (born 1976), Turkish volleyball player
- Barış Hersek (born 1988), Turkish basketball player
- Barış Kalaycı (born 2005), Turkish footballer
- Barış Manço (1943–1999), Turkish rock musician
- Baris Önes (born 1985), German politician
- Barış Örücü (born 1992), Turkish-German footballer
- Barış Özbek (born 1986), Turkish-German footballer
- Barış Özcan (born 1974), Turkish YouTuber
- Barış Özcan (born 1980), Turkish basketball player
- Barış Tok (born 1978), Turkish motorcycle racer
- Barış Alper Yılmaz (born 2000), Turkish footballer

== Surname ==
- Deniz Barış (born 1977), Turkish footballer
