= Süyümbike =

- Gender: Female

Origin
- Language: Turkish
- Meaning: A combination of words Süyüm lovely and Bike queen, woman

Other names
- Related names: Aybike, Aybüke, Bike, Büke, İsenbike

Süyümbike is a common Turkish given name. The name is produced by using two Turkish words: Süyüm and Büke (origin of Bike). In Turkish, "Süyüm" means lovely and "Büke" means queen and/or woman. Therefore, it means lovely queen or lovely woman

== Real People ==
- Süyümbike of Kazan, the last queen and the last ruler of Khanate of Kazan.
- Süyümbike Güvenç, photograph artist.

== Places ==
- Süyümbike Tower, symbol of Kazan named after Süyümbike of Kazan.
