= İsenbike =

- Gender: Female

Origin
- Language: Turkish
- Meaning: Wise Queen

Other names
- Related names: Aybike, Aybüke, Bike, Büke, Süyümbike

İsenbike is a Turkish given name. It comprises İsen and Büke (origin of Bike). In Turkish, "İsen" means "wise" and "Büke" means "queen" and "woman". Thus making it "Wise Queen". In Bashir and Tatar language "Isen" means "living", "live", "alive" and "Bike" means "woman", "lady".

== People ==
- İsenbike Togan, professor of history at the Middle East Technical University and daughter of Zeki Velidi Togan.
