= Nursel (name) =

- Gender: Female

Origin
- Language: Turkish

Nursel or Nurseli is a Turkish feminine given name. It is the combination of the words nur (light) and sili (beautiful, clean, virgin) and it means beautiful light

Notable people with the name include:

== Given names ==
- Nursel Aydoğan (born 1958), Turkish politician
- Nursel Duruel (born 1941), Turkish journalist and author
- Nursel Köse (born 1961), Turkish-German actress

== See also ==
- Aysel
- Günseli
- Tansel
