= Yıldızoğlu =

Yıldızoğlu is a Turkish surname. Notable people with the surname include:

- Aylin Yıldızoğlu (born 1975), Turkish female basketball player
- Ceyhun Yıldızoğlu (born 1967), Turkish professional basketball coach
