= Barlas (disambiguation) =

The Barlas were a Turko-Mongol nomadic confederation in Central Asia.

Barlas may also refer to:

- Barlas (given name), a Turkish given name.
- Barlas (surname), a surname
