= 2015 World Archery Youth Championships =

- Location: Yankton, United States
- Start date: 8 June 2015
- End date: 14 Jun 2015
- Competitors: 397 from 50 nations

The 2015 World Archery Youth Championships was the 14th edition of World Archery Youth Championships. The event was held in Yankton, South Dakota, United States between 8–14 June 2015, and was organised by World Archery. Junior events were held for those under 20, and Cadet for those under 17.

== Medal summary ==
=== Junior ===
==== Recurve ====
Event	Gold	Silver	Bronze
Men's individual	Min Byeongyeon; South Korea	Collin Klimitchek; United States	Lee Woo Seok; South Korea
Women's individual	Peng Chia-Mao; Chinese Taipei	Mackenzie Brown; United States	Tuyana Dashidorzhieva; Russia
Men's team	South Korea; Lee Woo Seok; Lee Seungshin; Min Byeongyeon	United States; Collin Klimitchek; Zach Garrett; Caleb Miller	Japan; Muto Hiroki; Sugio Tomoki; Ohi Kazuki
Women's team	South Korea; Lee Eun Gyeong; Kim Chaeyun; Kim Mijeon	Mexico; Karla Hinojosa; Rebeca Marquez; Laura Jaquelin Sosa	Chinese Taipei; Peng Chia-Mao; Wu Chia-Hung; Chang Hsin-Yi
Mixed Team	South Korea; Lee Eun Gyeong; Lee Woo Seok	Chinese Taipei; Peng Chia-Mao; Chen Hsin-Fu	France; Sophie Planeix; Thomas Koenig

==== Compound ====
Event	Gold	Silver	Bronze
Men's individual	Stephan Hansen; Denmark	David Houser; United States	Domagoj Buden; Croatia
Women's individual	Tanja Gellenthien; Denmark	Sarah Holst Sonnichsen; Denmark	Mariya Shkolna; Ukraine
Men's team	Turkey; Barış Tandoğan; Samet Can Yakalı; Furkan Dernekli	United States; Chris Bee; Steven Manfull; David Houser	Italy; Manuel Festi; Simone Baradel; Viviano Mior
Women's team	United States; Danielle Reynolds; Paige Pearce; Emily Fischer	Colombia; Sara López; Nora Valdez; Paula Roman	Turkey; Yeşim Bostan; Dilara Sevindik; Evrim Sağlam
Mixed Team	Colombia; Sara López; Camilo Cardona	Denmark; Tanja Gellenthien; Stephan Hansen	United States; Danielle Reynolds; Chris Bee

=== Cadet ===
==== Recurve ====
Event	Gold	Silver	Bronze
Men's individual	Marcus Vinicius D'Almeida; Brazil	Jan Van Tongeren; Netherlands	Lee Seungjun; South Korea
Women's individual	Hyeong Yeajin; South Korea	Sim Hyeonseung; South Korea	Eliana Claps; United States
Men's team	South Korea; Lee Seungjun; An Hyojin; Lee Wooju	United States; Ryan Oliver; Kim Geunwoo; Kim Minsoo	Brazil; Marcus Vinicius D'Almeida; Jhonata Brasil Lopes Dos Reis; Marcelo Da Silva Costa Filho
Women's team	South Korea; Sim Hyeonseung; Hyeong Yeajin; Lee Gahyun	Turkey; Yasemin Anagöz; Aybüke Gümrükçü; Gülnaz Büşranur Coşkun	Chinese Taipei; Yeh Hsiu-Ting; Chang Hsin-Yu; Tsai Yu-Ting
Mixed Team	South Korea; Sim Hyeonseung; Lee Seungjun	China; Li Xinxin; Fang Zhengmin	United States; Eliana Claps; Ryan Oliver

==== Compound ====
Event	Gold	Silver	Bronze
Men's individual	Viktor Orosz; Hungary	Serdar Bortay Maraş; Turkey	James Howse; United Kingdom
Women's individual	Fatimah Almashhadani; Iraq	Evelien Groeneveld; Netherlands	Dahlia Crook; United States
Men's team	United States; Dane Johnson; Daniel O'Connor; Cole Feterl	United Kingdom; James Howse; Luke Ralls; Adam Carpenter	Turkey; Mert Garip; Serdar Bortay Maraş; Emre Erkuş
Women's team	United States; Dahlia Crook; Cassidy Cox; Breanna Theodore	Mexico; Maria Fernanda Garza Espinosa; M. Esmeralda G. Sanchez; Carolina Estrada Castro	Australia; Madeline McSwain; Madeleine Salvestro; Niamh Jones
Mixed Team	Mexico; Maria Fernanda Garza Espinosa; Cecilio E. Quevedo	United States; Dahlia Crook; Dane Johnson	United Kingdom; Lucy Mason; James Howse

=== Medal table ===
Rank	Nation	Gold	Silver	Bronze	Total
1	South Korea	8	1	2	11
2	United States	3	7	4	14
3	Denmark	2	2	0	4
4	Turkey	1	2	2	5
5	Mexico	1	2	0	3
6	Chinese Taipei	1	1	2	4
7	Colombia	1	1	0	2
8	Brazil	1	0	1	2
9	Hungary	1	0	0	1
9	Iraq	1	0	0	1
11	Netherlands	0	2	0	2
12	Great Britain	0	1	2	3
13	China	0	1	0	1
14	Australia	0	0	1	1
14	Croatia	0	0	1	1
14	France	0	0	1	1
14	Italy	0	0	1	1
14	Japan	0	0	1	1
14	Russia	0	0	1	1
14	Ukraine	0	0	1	1
Totals (20 entries)		20	20	20	60
