= Keskin (disambiguation) =

Keskin is a town in Kırıkkale Province, Turkey.

Keskin may also refer to:

== Places in Turkey ==
- Keskin District, Kırıkkale Province
- Keskin, Gölpazarı, a village in Bilecik Province
- Keskin, Pervari, a village in Siirt Province

== People ==
- Aysu Keskin, Turkish female basketball player
- Ebrar Keskin (born 2007), Turkish para athlete
- Elif Keskin (born 2002), Turkish women's footballer
- Enes Keskin (born 2001), Turkish footballer
- Eren Keskin, Turkish human rights activist
- Gökhan Keskin, retired Turkish professional footballer
- Hakkı Keskin, Turkish-German politician
- Lucia Keskin (Chi With A C, born 2001), English YouTuber
- Ramazan Keskin (born 1999), Turkish footballer
