= Women's Library and Information Centre Foundation =

Library for female writers in Turkey

- Kadın Eserleri Kütüphanesi ve Bilgi Merkezi Vakfı

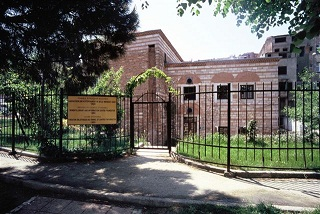
- Women's Library and Information Centre Foundation
- 41.03077479985388°N 28.9511725148317°E
- Location: Istanbul, Turkey
- Established: 1989

Other information
- Website: http://kadineserleri.org/

The Women's Library and Information Centre Foundation (WLICF) is the first and only women's library in Turkey. It was founded in Istanbul in 1989 and opened on April 14, 1990, mainly to assist research on the history of women. The library has assigned itself the mission of acquiring, protecting, and preserving the women-centred intellectual capital in Turkey with an emphasis on improving accessibility of information.

== Mission ==
In Turkey women have had limited access to education, public expression, and publications. This problem makes documenting women's history a source of empowerment for women. Information centres, archives, and libraries all over the world now document women's lives and contributions to facilitate research in women's studies.

The Women's Library and Information Centre Foundation was founded in order to compile accurate and comprehensive information about the history of women in Turkey. The Foundation Bill states the library's purpose: "to gather knowledge about the history of women, to present this information in an organized way to those who do research today and to preserve the written documents of today for future generations." The Information Centre was founded by Professor Jale Baysal, Associate Professor Füsun Akatlı, Aslı Davaz, Füsun Yaraş, and Associate Professor Şirin Tekeli.

== Funding ==
The establishment of the library was supported by the Istanbul Metropolitan Municipality, Fener library, and small contributions of around 190 people. A 2015 fundraising campaign sought to encourage donations, including sums as small as TL 25 ($8).

== Collections and archives ==
Books

The library has over 11,800 books, either written by women or on topics of interest to women. Reference information about these books is available in a computerized system.

Periodicals

The periodicals section consists of forty complete sets of titles of Ottoman and early Turkish Republic periodicals published between 1867 and 1928, 210 titles of women's periodicals published since 1928 and written with the new Turkish alphabet, and over 120 foreign language women's periodicals.

Ephemera

Two hundred and thirty boxes containing statutes of women's organizations, panel discussion texts, unpublished theses, miscellaneous information related to women, and statistics are classified under various topics. The ephemera section also preserves 631 doctoral and master dissertations.

Newspaper Clippings Collection

The newspaper clippings collection contains articles, interviews, and tens of thousands of clippings from the majority of daily Turkish newspapers and periodicals published since 1990. There are over 280 boxes of material pertaining to women's activities and studies in Turkey and the rest of the world.

Audio-Visual Collection

Activities organized by or held in the Library since its opening have been photographed and filmed. Information and documents about women from Ottoman times to the present are included in the visual archive classified by subject. This collection contains approximately 1,000 slides, 250 photographs, postcards, fifteen video tapes, ninety seven audio tapes and approximately 650 local and foreign posters.

Women Artists' Collection

The Women Artists' Collection documents the works of past and living female artists in the fields of painting, sculpture, photography, marbling, engraving, illustration, graphic arts, and cartoon. Documents belonging to 842 artists are classified in this section, including slides of the work of eighteen artists. Artist files contain curriculum vitae, publications about the artist, the artist's own printed material (catalogs, invitations to exhibitions, posters and similar printed material), and photos. Artists with material in this collection include Hale Asaf, Tomur Atagök, Hale Tenger, Lütfiye Batukan, Aliye Berger, Zerrin Bölükbaşı, Nevin Çokay, Hamiye Çolakoğlu, Alev Ebuzziya, Neşe Erdok, Ramize Erer, Seniye Fenmen, Ayfer Karamani, Füreya Koral and Şükriye Işık.

Women Writers' Collection

The collection is made up of 2000 files on 951 female writers, including Asiye Hatun, Leyla Hanım, Şazi Şaziye, Şeref Hanım, Nigar Hanım, Yaşar Nezihe Hanım, and Fatma Aliye Topuz. There are thirty files pertaining to Halide Edib Adıvar, twenty-seven files pertaining to Erendiz Atasü, and forty-nine files about Adalet Ağaoğlu in the collection. These files are classified separately for the pre-Republican and the Republican periods. The files contain interviews with the writers, information on their work, newspaper and magazine articles, criticism, and promotional writing.

Collection of Unpublished Articles

Over 1000 articles written in the field of women's studies in Turkish, English, French and German are available to researchers. Related entries may be found in a computer-aided retrieval system.

Women's Oral History Collection

The nucleus of the material in this section was formed by the transcription of audio and video recordings of discussions held during the pilot project of Women's Oral History. These discussions were supported by the Turkish government's General Directorate of Women's Status and Problems. The collection contains audio cassettes of interviews and transcriptions made in 1994 by fourteen women born before 1923, photos taken during these interviews and video recordings of four of these women. Still in its early stages, this section is currently conducting interviews with the surviving first graduates of the Erenköy Girls Lycee in Istanbul, as well as professional women who have made important contributions to their respective fields.

Private Archives and Women's Organizations Collection

Personal documents and records of women's organizations are preserved as a special collection and are open to researchers subject to the terms stated by the donors of the records. This collection contains more than 900 boxes of documents. Categorization of these documents is an ongoing process. The library and the archives are a reference institution and has no lending arrangement. The Foundation has published thirty six books related to its collections (bibliographies, catalogues, agendas, transcription of Ottoman women's periodicals) and has organized more than 535 cultural activities in the form of seminars, symposiums, exhibitions, and conferences.
