= Arthur Kornhauser =

American psychologist (1896–1990)

Arthur William Kornhauser (November 23, 1896 – December 11, 1990) was an American industrial psychologist. He was an early researcher on topics such as labor unions and worker attitudes, and advocated a form of industrial psychology that approached problems from the workers' standpoint rather than that of management. He has been described as one of the most important early figures in industrial psychology, and is particularly remembered for his focus on worker well-being. His work was interdisciplinary, crossing the boundaries between industrial psychology and sociology and political science.

== Early life and education ==
Kornhauser was born in Steubenville, Ohio on November 23, 1896. He studied psychology and biology at the University of Pittsburgh, graduating with a BS in 1917. Subsequently, during World War I, he worked with Walter Dill Scott to develop psychological and trade tests for the US Army.

Kornhauser obtained an MA from the Carnegie Institute of Technology in 1919, and worked as a research assistant at Scott's "Scott Company" from 1919 to 1920. His early research worked focused on the practical application of psychological testing to the needs of business. He completed his formal education with a Ph.D. in psychology from the University of Chicago in 1926. His dissertation was titled "A Statistical Study of Some Methods Used in Judging College Students".

Kornhauser began teaching business psychology at the University of Chicago in 1921, first as an instructor and later as an associate professor. He married his first wife, Beatrice Levy, in 1923. They had two children, William (1925), who became a renowned political sociologist, and Ruth (1927).

== Career ==
Kornhauser taught at the University of Chicago from 1921 to 1946. From 1922 to 1930, he was the most-published author in the Journal of Personnel Research, with 9 articles to his name. His research during this period focused on psychological testing. He served as a research fellow of the Social Science Research Council from 1928 to 1929, and was president of the business division of the American Association of Applied Psychology (which later became the Society for Industrial and Organizational Psychology) from 1941 to 1943. In addition to his teaching and research work, Kornhauser served as a consultant for numerous companies. During this period, Chicago was a major center of early industrial psychology, which was beginning to emerge as a distinct discipline.

Feeling slighted by the lack of attention and resources given to his work, Kornhauser left the U of C in 1943. After a brief research position at Columbia University, he move to Wayne State University, taking a joint appointment with the Department of Psychology and the Institute of Industrial and Labor Relations, which began to offer doctorates in 1955.

Kornhauser's research covered a broad range of topics. He worked to develop the opinion polling techniques of David Houser into rigorous scientific techniques. He pioneered the union-friendly application of industrial psychology, which up to then had been entirely used in the service of management. Later in his career, he focused on workers' mental health. His 1965 work Mental Health of the Industrial Worker put forth the spillover hypothesis, which traces the cause of problems in home and leisure life to problems at work. Ross Stagner, who chaired the Wayne State psychology department at the time, stated that his own administrative support for Kornhauser's writing of the book was "one of my significant contributions to the field."

Kornhauser retired from Wayne State in 1962. He died on December 11, 1990, of a stroke resulting from Parkinson's disease, at his home in a retirement community in Santa Barbara, California.

== Writings ==
- Psychological Tests in Business (1924) (with Forrest Kingsbury)
- When Labor Votes: A Study of Auto Workers (1956)
- Mental Health of the Industrial Worker (1965)
- How to Study

== Works cited ==
- Zickar, Michael J. (April 2003). "Remembering Arthur Kornhauser: Industrial Psychology's Advocate for Worker Well-Being". Journal of Applied Psychology. 88 (2): 363–369. doi:10.1037/0021-9010.88.2.363. PMID 12731721.
