= Aila (name) =

Female name

Aila is a female given name found in several different languages, pronounced as "ay-luh" or "eye-luh" depending on origin. In Finnish, Aila (and the variant Aili), are names that originated in Lapland. It comes from Inari Sámi, possibly ultimately an equivalent of Helga or Alice. In Scottish Gaelic, it means "from the strong place". It is also a variant spelling of the Turkish name Ayla (meaning "halo of the moon") and the Hebrew name Eilah (meaning "oak tree"). In Arabic and in Urdu, Aila means noble.

== Given name ==
- Aila Flöjt (born 1946), Finnish ski orienteering competitor
- Aila Keto (born 1943), Australian conservationist of Finnish origin
- Aila Meriluoto (1924–2019), Finnish writer
- Aila Paloniemi (born 1956), Finnish politician
- Aila Winkler (born 1969), Croatian-American tennis player

== Surname ==
- Eddie Aila, Papua New Guinean rugby football player
- Pururavas Aila, the first king of the Aila dynasty or the Somavamsha
- Shrouq Al Aila, Palestinian journalist

== See also ==
- Aila (disambiguation)
