= Bike (given name) =

- Gender: Female

Origin
- Language: Turkish
- Meaning: Queen, Woman

Other names
- Related names: Bikem, Aybike, Aybüke, Büke, İsenbike, Süyümbike,

Bike is a common Turkish given name. It is an Oghuz accented version of Büke which is also a Turkish given name. In Turkish, "Bike" means "Queen" and/or "Woman". It also means "wise, old person"; "bride"; or "the dragon with seven heads" in an old Turkish epic. It is also the name of one of the years in the "Twelve Animal Turkish Calendar".
