= Günseli =

- Gender: Female

Origin
- Language: Turkish
- Meaning: A combination of words "Gün" (day, sun) and "Sili" (beautiful, clean, virgin)

Other names
- Related names: Tansel, Aysel, Nursel

Günseli, Günsel or Günsili is a Turkish given name for females. The name is produced by using two Turkish words: gün (day, sun) and sili (beautiful, clean, virgin). Therefore "Günseli" and "Günsel" means day beauty

== People ==
- Günseli Başar, former Turkish beauty contestant and Miss Europe 1952.

== Fictional characters ==
- Günseli Ediz, one of the main characters in Tutunamayanlar.
