= Tansel =

Tansel is a Turkish name with the meaning dawn beauty or dawn light and may refer to:

- Tansel Başer (born 1978), Australian-Turkish footballer
- Oğuz Tansel (1915-1994), Turkish poet and folklorist

== See also ==
- Günseli
- Aysel
- Nursel
