= Yaşar Nezihe =

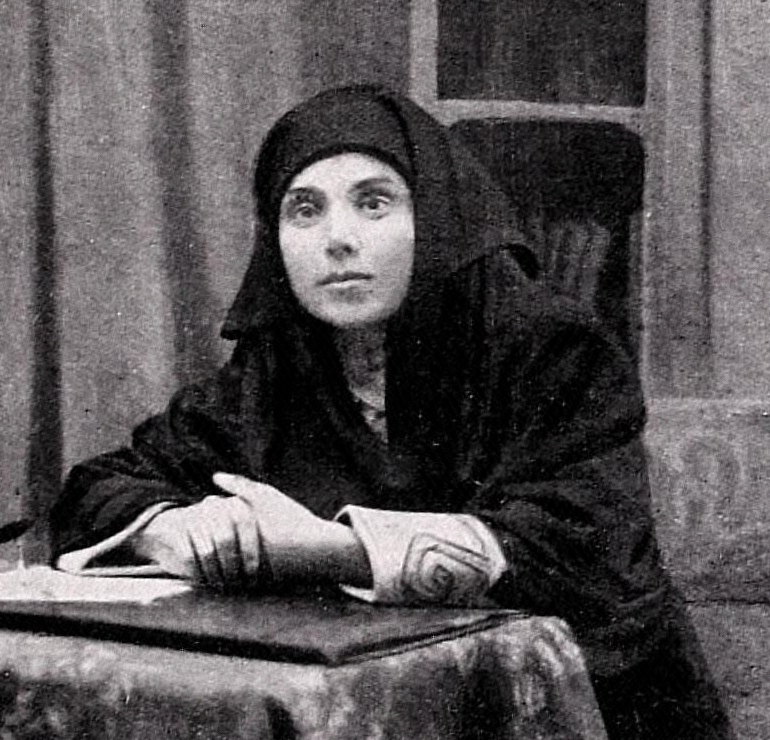
- Yaşar Nezihe (1919 or before)
- Born: 1882; Istanbul
- Died: 5 Kasım 1971; Istanbul
- Occupation: Turkish poet

Yaşar Nezihe (1882 - 5 November 1971) was considered as one of the female poets in the Ottoman Period. She is known as the writer of the first Turkish poem for International Workers' Day on 1 May.

Yaşar Nezihe differed from other female poets of the period in the sense of her life story and a contrary literary identity. Throughout her lifetime, she wrote poems about her penurious and challenging childhood as well as her love life and marriages.

Being known as the first female poet whose works were published in Aydınlık Dergisi (Enlightenment Journal), Yaşar Nezihe also became prominent for supporting labour unrests and her activist identity. She was recognised as a socialist poet who gave voice to poverty in her poems.

She wrote the poem named "Gazete Sahiplerine" (To Newspaper Owners) addressing the executives with the intent of supporting labourers who were on strike because of the disagreement between newspaper owners and Mürettipler Cemiyeti (Typesetters Society).

== Early life ==
Yaşar Nezihe was born in Silivri, Istanbul in 1882 as one of the five children of a low-income family. She was the only child survived in the family. She was only six years old when she lost her mother, Kaya Hanım. Thereafter, her paralysed aunt and her alcoholic father looked after her.

After spending most of her time in the streets, she enrolled in a school herself due to the indifference of her family. The moment when her father throw her out of the house because of her independent behaviour, he actually paved the way for her "liberation".

She had three unhappy marriages and her two children died of food shortage. To earn money, she wrote letters for illiterate people and stitched.

With the Surname Law adopted in 1934, her surname changed into "Bükülmez".

Yaşar Nezihe attempted to suicide twice in her life. She died in Istanbul on 5 November 1971, when she was 89 years old.

== Works ==
As a poet, Yaşar Nezihe Bükülmez continued her studies and wrote many poems between 1896 and 1953. In May 1923, her poem "1 Mayıs" that favours labour unrests was published.

After her first book Bir Deste Menekşe (A Bouquet of Violet), the second book named Feryâdlarım (My Screeches) was published in 1925.

Her first poem was published in the journal, Malumat. Afterwards, her poems were published in many women's newspapers and journals, particularly in Kadınlar Dergisi (Women's Journal).

In the archive of the researcher Taha Toros, there are three collections of her poems. Şiir Defteri (Poems Book) is her last, unpublished work that she resigned to Toros.

Since 1895, her works were published in the journals such as Malumat ve Terakki and Nazikter with pen names Mazlume, Mahmure and Mehcure. "Hazân Unvanlı Manzûme", "Kardeş Yüreği", "Efsûs", "Leyâl-i Pür-Azâb" are some of her works.

Being the first female poet wrote in Aydınlık Dergisi, Yaşar Nezihe Bükülmez was accused of being a communist because of her writings, her membership of Osmanlı Amele Cemiyeti and support for labour unrests and was arrested.

== See also ==
- Women's Library and Information Centre Foundation
