= Legio X Fretensis =

Roman legion

Coordinates: 31°19′13″N 35°20′59″E

- A map of the Roman Empire in AD 125, under emperor Hadrian, showing the LEGIO X FRETENSIS, stationed at Hierosolyma (Jerusalem), in Judaea province, from AD 73 until the 4th century
- Active: 41 BC to after 410
- Country: Roman Empire
- Type: Roman legion (Marian)
- Garrison/HQ: Judaea (20s BC); Syria (c. 6 – 66); Jerusalem (c. 73 – late 3rd century); Aila (late 3rd century – after 410s)
- Nicknames: Fretensis, "of the sea strait"
- Mascots: Bull, ship, Neptune, boar
- Engagements: Battle of Naulochus (36 BC); Battle of Actium (31 BC); Corbulo Parthian campaign; First Jewish-Roman War (66–73); Siege of Masada (72–73); Trajan Parthian campaign; Bar Kokhba's revolt (132–135)

Commanders
- Notable commanders: Gnaeus Domitius Corbulo; Vespasian (campaign); Titus; Sextus Lucilius Bassus; Trajan (campaign); Sextus Julius Severus

Legio X Fretensis ("Tenth legion of the Strait") was a legion of the Imperial Roman army. It was founded by the young Gaius Octavius (later to become Augustus Caesar) in 41/40 BC to fight during the period of civil war that started the dissolution of the Roman Republic. X Fretensis is then recorded to have existed at least until the 410s.

X Fretensis symbols were the bull (the holy animal of the goddess Venus, mythical ancestor of the gens Julia), a ship (probably a reference to the Battles of Naulochus and/or Actium), the god Neptune, and a boar. The symbol of Taurus may also mean that it was organized between 20 April and 20 May.

== History ==
=== Aelius Gallus' expedition ===
In 26 BC, the Legion under Aelius Gallus was ordered by Augustus to undertake a military expedition to Arabia Felix, where Gallus was to either conclude treaties making the Arabian people foederati (i.e. client states), or to subdue them if they resisted. According to Theodor Mommsen, Aelius Gallus sailed with 10,000 legionaries from Egypt and landed at Leuce Kome, a trading port of the Nabateans in the northwestern Arabian coast. Gallus' subsequent movements relied on a Nabataean guide called Syllaeus, who proved to be untrustworthy. As a result of Syllaeus' misdirections, the army took six months to reach Mariba, the Sabaean capital.

They besieged Ma'rib unsuccessfully for a week, before being forced to withdraw. Mommsen ascribed this to a combination of disease, over-extended supply lines, and a tougher desert environment than the Romans had expected. Gallus' retreat to Alexandria was completed in sixty days. Details of the expedition to Arabia Felix are given by Strabo, Cassius Dio and Pliny the Elder. Strabo's account is particularly detailed, and derives most of its information from Aelius Gallus himself, who was a personal friend of Strabo. The campaign is the subject of a 1951 novel, The Eagle and the Sun by Lord Belhaven, who had done military and civilian service in the region.

=== Civil wars of the Republic and early Empire ===
Octavian, later known as Augustus, levied a legion and gave it the number ten, as a reference to Julius Caesar's famous Tenth Legion.

In 36 BC, the Tenth Legion fought under Octavian against Sextus Pompey in the Battle of Naulochus, where it earned its cognomen Fretensis. The name refers to the fact that the battle took place near the sea Strait of Messina (Fretum Siculum).

In 31 BC, it fought in the Battle of Actium against Mark Antony. Although Actium was a battle at sea, the legion was able to board enemy ships that had been hooked close by means of an iron grapnel known as the Corvus. Its key participation in this battle is probably the reason that the legion also used a trireme as one of its symbols. Actium marked the end of the civil war and the rise to power of Octavian, who was proclaimed Augustus some years later.

It is uncertain when the legion was redeployed to Macedonia. An inscription found in the valley of the Strymon river attests that a group of soldiers from the unit had built a bridge. While stationed in that province, it fought battles with the Sarmatae who attacked the province in 16 BC. Not much later, Legio X Fretensis went to Syria. An inscription in the temple of Bel in Palmyra dated AD 14–19, signed by the commander of the legion, was dedicated to members of the emperor's family. This has led experts to believe X Fretensis took part in Germanicus' campaign in the East, as well that the legion was stationed at Zeugma to secure the frontier with Parthia.

In the year 6 CE, Publius Sulpicius Quirinius, governor of Syria, led X Fretensis and III Gallica, VI Ferrata, and XII Fulminata in suppressing the revolt that sprung out after the deposition of Herod Archelaus.

Under Nero in 58-63 CE, X Fretensis participated in the campaigns of Gnaeus Domitius Corbulo against the Parthians.

=== First Jewish–Roman War ===
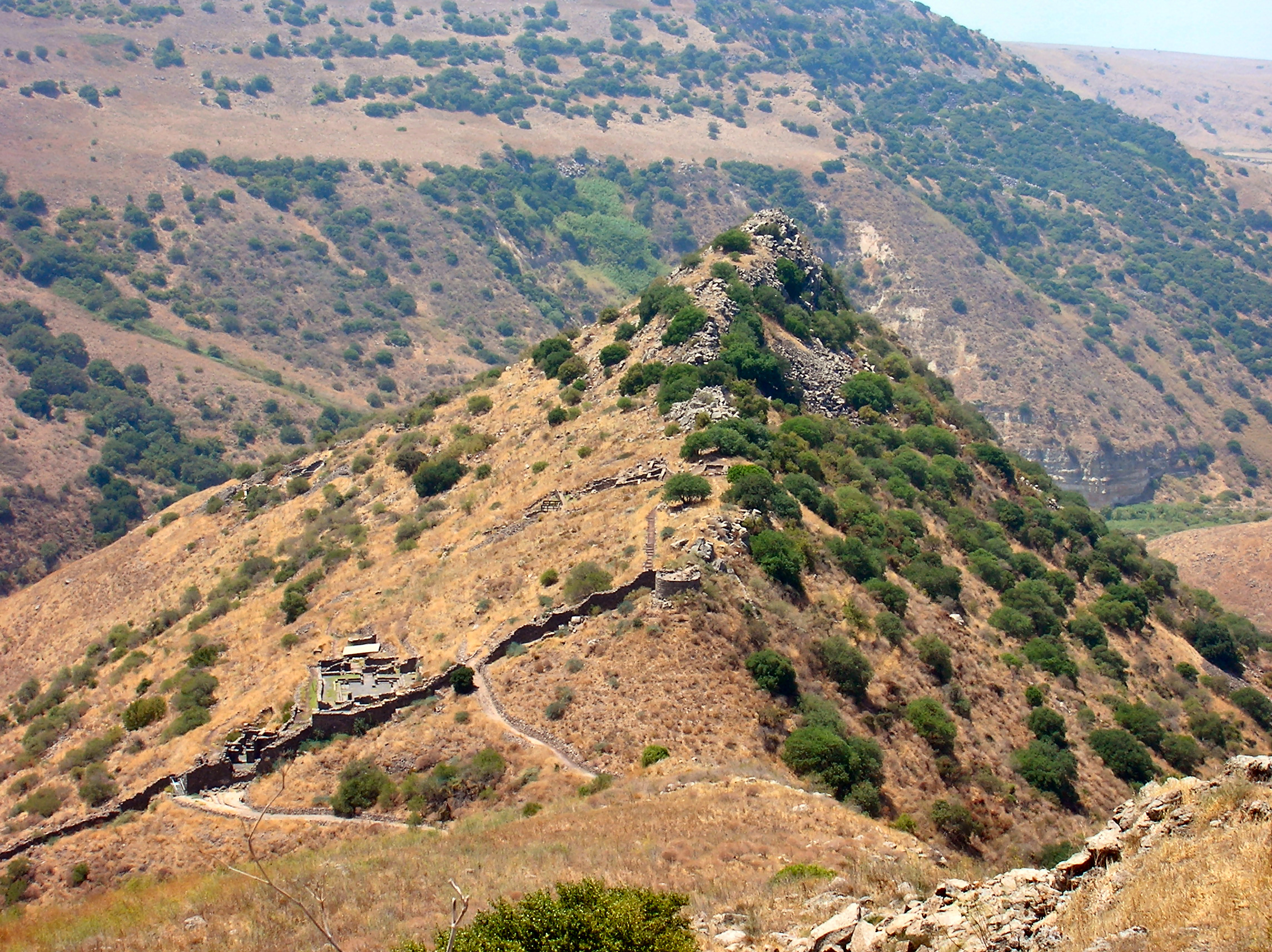
Ruins of the city of Gamla, conquered by X Fretensis in 67

X Fretensis was centrally involved in the First Jewish–Roman War (66–73), under the supreme command of Vespasian.

In 66, the X Fretensis and V Macedonica went to Alexandria for an invasion of Ethiopia planned by Nero. However, the two legions were needed in Judaea to suppress a revolt. After spending the winter in Ptolemais Ace (modern Acre, Israel), X Fretensis and V Macedonica relocated in the coastal city of Caesarea Maritima (67/68). This was due to the large number of legions being mobilized in Ptolemais, under Marcus Ulpius Traianus, future governor of Syria and father of the emperor Trajan. During that same winter, the Caesarea camp of Xth and Vth hosted Vespasian, who was forced to go to Rome the following year, where he seized power. Vespasian's son Titus finished the suppression of the revolt.

When Tarichacae and Gamla were conquered, the X Fretensis moved to Scythopolis (modern Bet She'an), just west of the Jordan River. In the summer of 68, X Fretensis destroyed the monastery of Qumran, where the Dead Sea Scrolls are believed to have originated. Its winter camp was at Jericho.

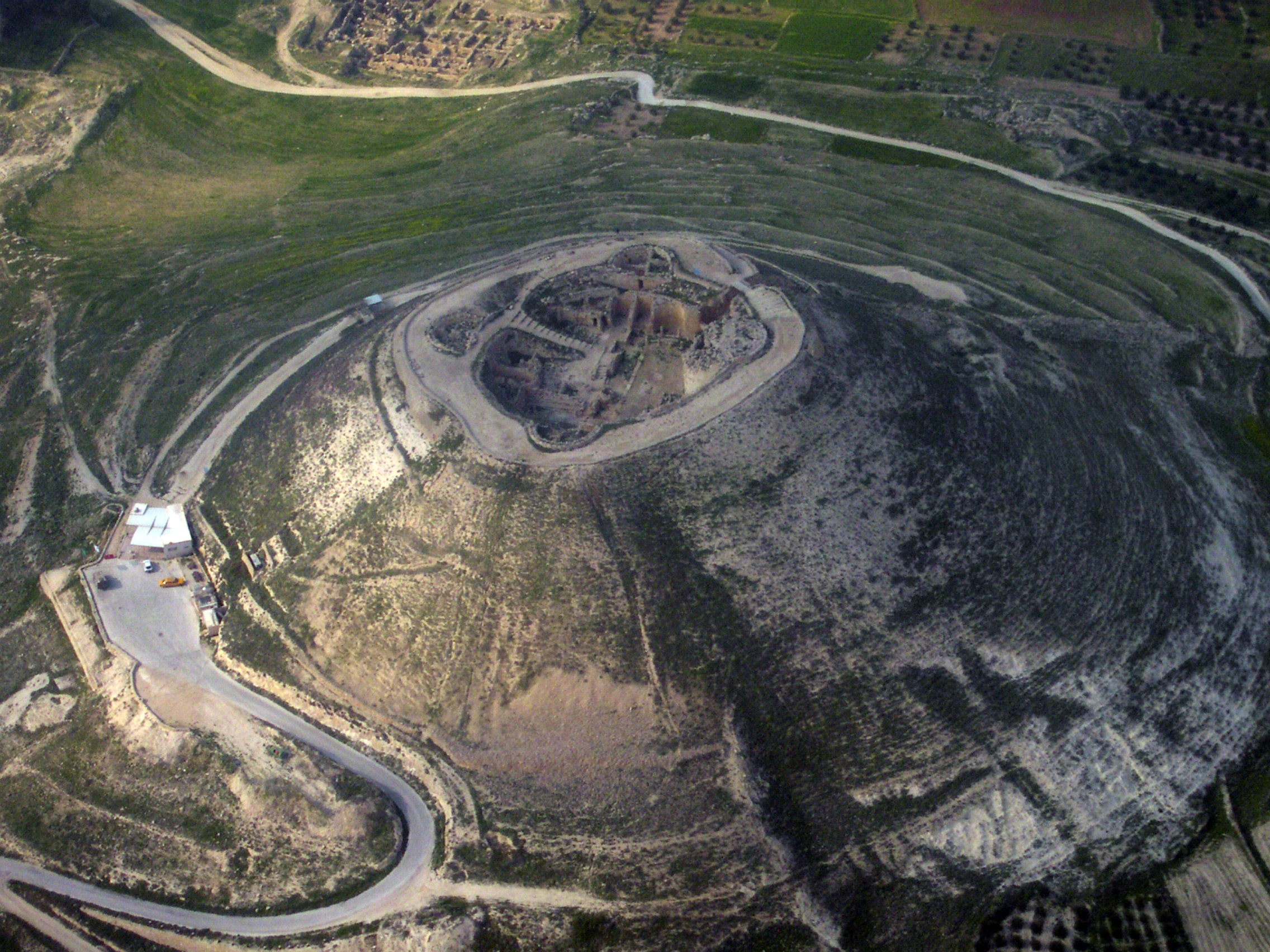
Herodium one of the fortresses of the Jewish revolt, conquered by the X Fretensis

By 70, the rebellion in all of Judaea had been crushed, except for Jerusalem and a few fortresses, including Masada. In that year X Fretensis, in conjunction with V Macedonica, XII Fulminata, and XV Apollinaris, began the siege of Jerusalem, stronghold of the rebellion. The Xth camped on the Mount of Olives. During the siege, Legio X gained fame in the effective use of their various war machines. It was noted that they were able to hurl stones that weighed a talent, about 25 kg, a distance of two furlongs (400 m) or further.

The projectiles of their ballistae caused heavy damage to the ramparts. According to Josephus (in vol. III of his history of the Judaean war), Larcius Lepidus was the commanding officer of the X Legion. The siege of Jerusalem lasted five months and the besieged population experienced all the terrible rigors of starvation. The combined assaults of the legions succeeded in taking the city, which was then subjected to destruction.

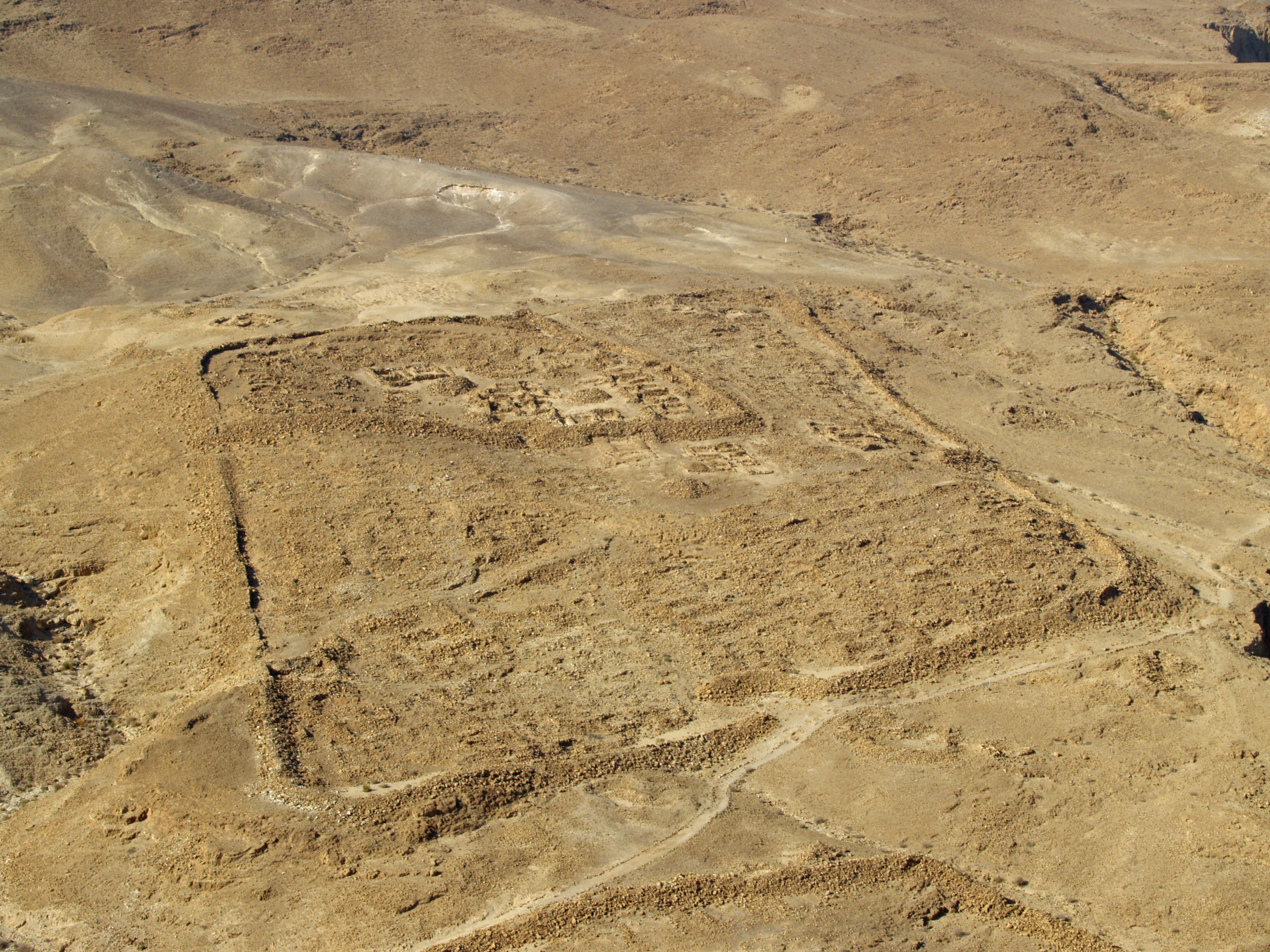
Remnants of one of several legionary camps of X Fretensis at Masada in Israel, just outside the circumvallation wall which can be seen at the bottom of the image

During the spring of 71, Titus set sail for Rome. A new military governor was then appointed from Rome, Sextus Lucilius Bassus, whose assigned task was to undertake the "mopping-up" operations in Judaea. Naturally, he used X Fretensis to oppose the few remaining fortresses that still resisted. As part of this, X Fretensis took Herodium, and then crossed the Jordan to capture the fortress of Machaerus on the shore of the Dead Sea. Due to illness, Bassus did not live to complete his mission.

Lucius Flavius Silva replaced him, and moved against the last Jewish stronghold, Masada, probably in the autumn of 72. He used Legio X, auxiliary troops, and thousands of Jewish prisoners. After his orders for surrender were rejected, Silva established several base camps and a wall of circumvallation completely around the fortress. When the Romans finally broke through the walls of this citadel, they discovered that the Jewish defenders had chosen death with a mass suicide.

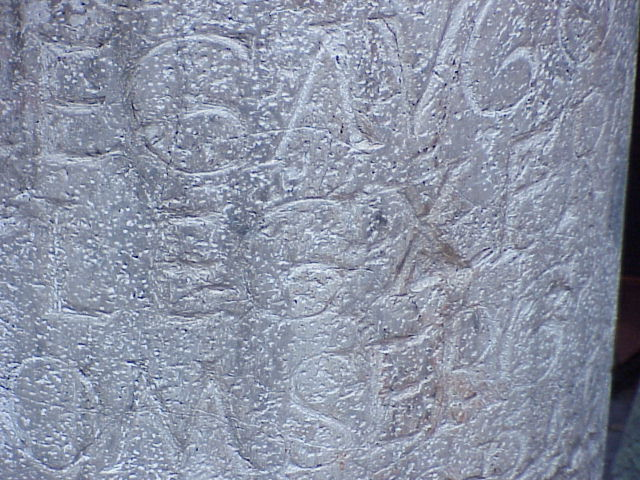
"LEGXF", an inscription of the legion in Jerusalem

After the conclusion of the Jewish revolt, Legio X Fretensis was permanently garrisoned in Jerusalem, while Judea proper and Idumaea were designated as a military zone (campus legionis) under the control of its officers. The legion's main camp was positioned on Jerusalem's Western Hill, located in the southern half of what is now the Old City, which had been levelled of all former buildings. The camp of the Tenth was built using the surviving portions of the walls of Herod's royal palace, demolished by order of Titus. Once the Romans rebuilt parts of the destroyed city as the pagan city of Aelia Capitolina, the camp found itself at the end of the cardo maximus. Alongside its main base in Jerusalem, the legion maintained additional stations in Beit Guvrin and present-day Abu Ghosh.

At the time, Legio X was the sole legion assigned to maintain the peace in Judaea, and was directly under the command of the governor of the province, who was also legate of the legion. This combination of offices made this posting important, and several of the men assigned to it had previous experience commanding a legion. When a second legion was assigned to Judaea, and the province promoted to consular status, the political status of legate of this legion declined. Dabrowa observes, "he was subordinate to the governor of Judaea just like the commander of the second legion".

=== Bar Kokhba Revolt ===
After participating in Trajan's Parthian campaign, Fretensis was caught up in the Bar Kokhba's revolt (132–135).

A possible cause for the revolt was the decision of Emperor Hadrian to build a pagan temple to Jupiter in Jerusalem. Simon Bar Kokhba started the revolt and inflicted massive casualties on the Romans. The war ended when the Roman army — including Fretensis and Danubian troops under the command of Sextus Julius Severus — reconquered the entire territory and successfully besieged the last Jewish stronghold, the fortress of Betar. Legio X Fretensis sustained heavy casualties in the course of the revolt.

As a consequence of the unrest in the region, Fretensis was supported by several other legions, of which the Legio VI Ferrata was stationed at a camp which became known as Lejjun (from "legion").

=== Later history ===
A vexillation, or detachment, of X Fretensis along with other troops stationed in eastern provinces, fought in the Marcomannic campaign of Marcus Aurelius. When this vexillation arrived or what part it played in the campaign is not known.

In 193, the legion supported Pescennius Niger against Septimius Severus, and was possibly involved in a local struggle between Jews and Samaritans. The legion was still in Jerusalem at the time of Caracalla (r. 211–217) or Elagabalus (r. 218–222).

Under Gallienus (r. 253–268), another vexillation of Fretensis was drawn to fight in the war against the Gallic Empire. However, that unit defected to the other side.

The legion moved to Aila, close to modern Aqaba, probably during Diocletian's reforms around 300, and is recorded as still camping there at the time of the compilation of the Notitia Dignitatum in the 390s, when it is reported serving under the Dux Palaestinae. The legion was replaced by a Moorish cavalry unit from the Legio I Illyricorum.

== Archaeology ==
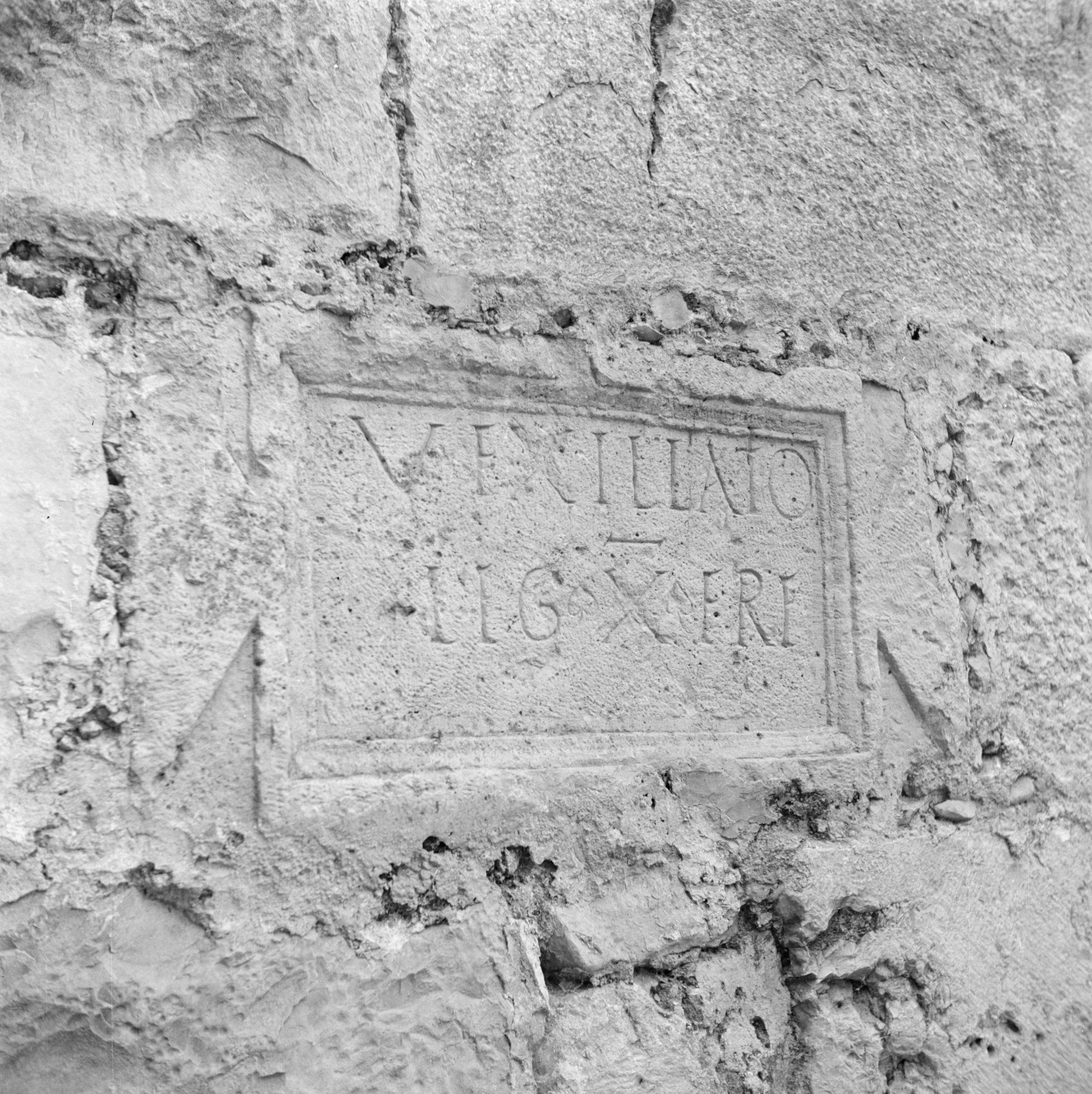
The inscription at Abu Ghosh, in 1948

A Latin inscription of the end of the 2nd century, found in the Benedictine monastery in Abu Ghosh, 15 km west of Jerusalem, marks the presence of a vexillatio detachment of X Fretensis:

VEXILLATIO
LEG X FRE

Some fragments bearing the "L.X.F" mark of the Legio X Fretensis are present at the Tower of David in Jerusalem. Roman Law required all pottery to bear the maker's stamp, and the Legion pottery works just to the West of Jerusalem were no exception. A huge production of pottery bearing the marks of the Legio X Fretensis has been discovered in Jerusalem. The mark "LE X FR" was also used in the pottery of the Legion.

== See also ==
- List of Roman legions
