= Ayla =

Ayla may refer to:

- Ayla (name), a given name in some languages, especially a common Turkish name
- Ayla (city), a medieval city at the site of Aqaba, Jordan
- Ayla (Earth's Children), the main character of the Earth's Children novel series
- Ayla (Chrono Trigger), a character from the 1995 video game Chrono Trigger
- Ayla Ranzz, a DC superheroine also known as Lightning Lass, Light Lass, and Spark
- Daihatsu Ayla, another name for the car Toyota Agya
- Lae Airfield, an airport with ICAO code "AYLA"
- Ayla (producer), a German trance producer and DJ
- Ayla: The Daughter of War, a 2017 Korean - Turkish film
- "Ayla", a song by Australian pop group Flash and the Pan
- "Ayla", a song by German DJ Kosmonova
