= Éala (given name) =

Irish feminine given name

- Pronunciation: AY-lə, EH-lə
- Gender: Female
- Language: Irish

Éala is an Irish feminine given name. It might be influenced by eala, the Irish word for swan. While eala is pronounced with a short a sound, the addition of the síneadh fada alters the pronunciation of the name Éala to Ayla, pronounced with a long a sound. Another source suggests the name Éala has been influenced by the similar name Ella. Éala has also been connected to the similar sounding Irish feminine names Éile or Aodhla. All are unrelated, similar sounding names with a sound pattern that is currently fashionable in the Anglosphere. The name Éala has increased in popularity in Ireland in recent years and was among the 10 most popular names for Irish baby girls in 2025.
