= Tülin Altıntaş =

Turkish volleyball player (born 1982)

Tülin Altıntaş (born 1982, in Balıkesir) is a Turkish volleyball player. Tülin is 187 cm and plays as middle blocker. She plays for DYO Karşıyaka and wears number 11. She also played for Güneş Sigorta, Vakıfbank, 75.Yıl, Yeşilyurt and Fenerbahçe Acıbadem.

== See also ==
- Turkish women in sports
