= Büke =

- Gender: Male, Female

Origin
- Language: Turkish
- Meaning: Wise person

Other names
- Related names: Aybike, Aybüke, Bike, İsenbike, Süyümbike

Büke is an uncommon Turkish given name.

In Turkish, "Büke" means "wise, knowledgeable person".

It is "the dragon with seven heads" in an old Turkish epic. Büke also the name of one of the years in the "Twelve Animal Turkish Calendar".

== Fictional characters ==
- A character in Kyrgyz writer Chingiz Aitmatov's novel The White Ship.
