= Barlas (surname) =

Barlas is a surname. Notable people with the surname include:

- Ali Barlas (1869–1953), Turkish politician
- Aqil Hussain Barlas (1927–1989), Indian lawyer and diplomat
- Asma Barlas (born 1950), Pakistani journalist
- Cemil Sait Barlas (1905–1964), Turkish journalist and politician
- Faruk Barlas (1915–1994), Turkish football player
- Fevziye Rahgozar Barlas (born 1955), Afghan poet
- John Barlas (1860–1914), English poet and political activist
- Serpil Barlas (1957–2021), Turkish actress and singer
- Simay Barlas (born 1998), Turkish actress
