= Süreyya Aylin Antmen =

Contemporary Turkish poet, essayist, writer and editor

Aylin Antmen
- Born: 1981 (age 44–45); Istanbul, Turkey
- Education: Sociology Istanbul University
- Occupations: Poet, Essayist & Editor
- Notable work: Sonsuzluğa Kiracı, Geceyle Bir, Ateş Sözcükleri, Bırakma Dersleri
- Website: http://www.aylinantmen.com

Aylin Antmen (born 1981) is a contemporary Turkish poet, essayist, writer and editor.

== Biography ==
Aylin Antmen was born in 1981 in Istanbul. She is a Turkish writer and poet. She wrote her first poem when she was 13 years old. She has published poetry and prose. Antmen’s first published poem appeared in Patika Poetry Review in 2004. Her poems and articles were published in several literary journals like Şiir Ülkesi, Damar, Öteki-siz, NO Edebiyat, Varlık, Cumhuriyet Kitap, Papirüs Güncel, Yeni E and Özgür Edebiyat. In 2008, her work Sonsuzluğa Kiracı was found “remarkable” at the Yaşar Nabi Nayır Youth Awards. Her poems have been translated into English, Zaza, Urdu, Kurdish and French. Currently, she is a student in the department of Sociology at Istanbul University.

== Books ==
- Sonsuzluğa Kiracı (Tenant to Eternity) May 2011. Şiirden Books. ISBN 978-605-4509-00-3 (The second edition, October, 2016. Ve Publishing House. ISBN 978-605-9626-06-4
- Geceyle Bir October, 2016. Ve Publishing House. ISBN 978-605-9626-05-7
- Ateş Sözcükleri" September, 2018. Ve Publishing House. ISBN 978-605-9626-19-4
- Bırakma Dersleri February, 2021. Ve Publishing House. ISBN 978-605-9626-32-3
- Arzunun Koordinatları, May, 2026. Ve Publishing House. ISBN 978-605-9626-50-7

== Books she contributed ==
- Turkish Poetry Today 2017, Red Hand Books, 2017. (England)
- Mantis Journal, Stanford University Press, 2019. (US)
- The Enchanting Verses Literary Review, 2020 (e-magazin) (India)
- Honar u Jamee Review, 2021 (Iran)
- Circumference Magazine, 2023 (USA)
- The Pulse of Contemporary Turkish Poems from the New Millenium, Syracuse University Press, 2025 (USA)
- The Fortnightly Review, 2025 (e-magazin) (England)

== Awards ==
- 2008 Yaşar Nabi Nayır Youth Awards: "Remarkable" for Sonsuzluğa Kiracı
