= Aybüke Gümrükçü =

Turkish recurve archer (born 1998)

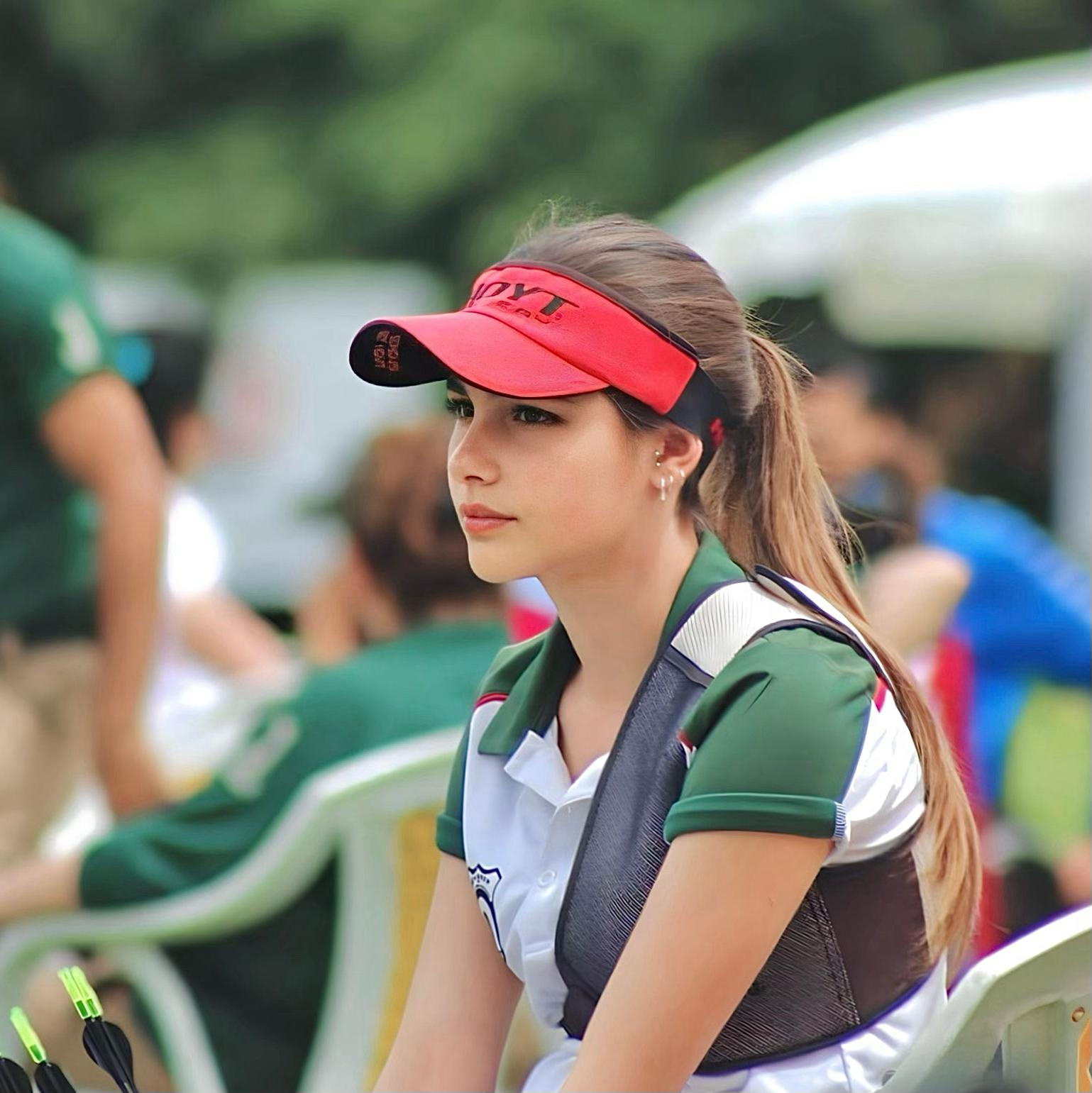
- Aybüke Gümrükçü (2024)

Personal information
- Nationality: Turkish
- Born: 14 May 1998 (age 28) Samsun, Turkey
- Home town: Samsun, Turkey

Sport
- Country: Turkey
- Sport: Archery
- Event: Archery Recurve
- Team: Samsun Okçuluk SK
- Coached by: Yusuf Göktuğ Ergin
Medal record
Archery Recurve
Representing Turkey

Aybüke Gümrükçü (born 14 May 1998) is a Turkish recurve archer.

== Early years ==
In the sommer holiday after the ninth grade at the high school, the 15-year old Gümrükçü got interested in tennis and archery. As she applied to the local archery club Samsun Okçuluk GSK, she was rejected upon the reason, she had past the starting age and her body was weak for this sport. She insisted for admission while she was watching the exercises one month long. After club's agreement for trials and her pretty good shots, she was included into the club although she was out of the starting age .

She was unsuccessful in the national tournaments in 2014. She considered giving up archery, but with her parent's support, she worked even harder, and st a Turkish seniors record of 582 points, improving the former record anout two points. In 2015, she became Turkish junior champion, and was admitted to the Turkey nwomen's national archery team.

== Sport career ==
Gümrükçü started with archery in 2013, and debuted internationally in 2015.

She won the silver medal in the recurce team event at the 2015 World Archery Youth Championships in Yankton, South Dakota, USA with Yasemin Ecem Anagöz and Gülnaz Büşranur Coşkun. Again that yar, she took the bronze medal in the team event at the second leg of the European Youth Cup Ranking Circuit in Rome, Italy.

She won the bronze medal in the senior category with her teammates at the 2016 Turkish Archery Championships. The same year representing her high school, she became champion at the Interschool Samsun Provincial Archery Championship. At the 2016 Gymnasiade in Trabzon, Turkey, she took the bronze medal in the individual event.

She became champion in the recurve individual event at the 2017 Turkish Outdoor Archery Championships in Antalya.

She captured the gold medal with her teammates Gönül Pulat and Aysima Karaoğlu from the same club at the 2018 Kahraman Bagatır Spring Arrows Turkey Cup.

== Personal life ==
Aybüke Gümrükçü was born in Samsun, northern Turkey on 14 May 1998.

After completing her secondary education at İlkadım Fine Arts High School in her hometown, she entered Istanbul Commerce University in 2017 to study Interior Archiyecture in the Architecture and Design Faculty on scholarship quota for national athletes.
