= Aila =

Aila or AILA may refer to:

== Places ==
- Aila, the Roman and Arabic name for Aqaba, a town in Jordan, and also the Arabic name for a fortress on the nearby Pharaoh's Island
- Aila, village in Saue Parish, Harju County, Estonia
- Äila, village in Lääneranna Parish, Pärnu County, Estonia
- Ailã, a river in Brazil which has its source at Monte Caburaí

== Organizations ==
- American Immigration Lawyers Association
- Australian Institute of Landscape Architects
- Association Internationale de la Linguistique Appliquée, the International Association of Applied Linguistics
- American Indian Library Association
- AILA, the NASDAQ symbol for Air L.A., a former American regional airline

== Other ==
- Aila (liquor), a Newari alcoholic beverage
- Aeropuerto Internacional Las Américas, an international airport in the Dominican Republic
- Aila dynasty, a dynasty of kings of ancient India
- Aila (name) a feminine given name
- Cyclone Aila, a 2009 cyclone
- Aila (Suikoden III), a fictional character from the PlayStation 2 video game Suikoden III
- Aila, an alternate name of the Tahitian Chestnut tree (Inocarpus fagifer)
