= Güneş Murat Tezcür =

Güneş Murat Tezcür (English: Gunes Murat Tezcur), a professor of Political Science, is the Director of School of Politics and Global Studies at Arizona State University (ASU). He received his Ph.D. from the University of Michigan in 2005. Previously, he held the Jalal Talabani Endowed Chair at the University of Central Florida (UCF). He also established The Kurdish Political Studies Program at UCF, the first and only academic entity in North America dedicated to the study of Kurdish issues, in 2015. His research revolves around Middle East politics with a specific focus on political violence, Islamic politics, and democratization in Iran and Turkey. His most recent book is Liminal Minorities: Religion and Mass Violence in Muslim Societies (Cornell University Press, 2024). Liminal Minorities won the Best Book Award of the Religion and International Relations Section of the International Studies Association, the Hubert Morken Best Book Award of the Religion and Politics Section of the American Political Science Association, and the Best Book by a Senior Scholar Award of the Middle East and North African Politics Section of the American Political Science Association. Tezcür is also the editor of The Oxford Handbook of Turkish Politics and Kurds and Yezidis in the Middle East: Shifting Identities, Borders, and the Experience of Minority Communities.

His best-known works are on the interrelated dynamics of Islamic party politics and democratic governance and on the Kurdish insurgency in Turkey in which he explains why ordinary individuals take risks and join a rebellion. The latter work is based on an original dataset involving biographies of thousands of militants. He argues that the ethnic cleavages do not matter by themselves but they become politically salient when individuals from a particular ethnic minority face state repression and see their ethnicity and identity under threat. Women have their distinctive motivates to take arms. The intersection of class and gender shapes distinctive patterns of mobilization among women. In particular, uneducated women with lower-class backgrounds join movements because it provides them with the most viable way out of patriarchal relations.
