= Nursel =

Zimbabwean musical artist (born 1984)

- Also known as: Nursel Light, Nursel Mandiopera
- Born: Nursel Masuka; 10 May 1984 (age 42); Harare, Zimbabwe
- Origin: Zimbabwean
- Genre: Gospel music
- Occupations: Singer, songwriter
- Years active: 2016–present

Nursel Musaka (born 10 May 1984) is a Zimbabwean gospel music artist based in the United Kingdom.

== Background ==
Born Nursel Masuka in Masvingo, Zimbabwe, she attended her early education at Langham Secondary School where she started music in high school choir.

Nursel released her debut album Like Heaven in 2016 whose title track performed on Star FM Zimbabwe charts in Zimbabwe. In 2018, she released an album called You Are My God and the highlights of the album launch were featured on the SKY TV's Digging Deep Show and Mira Ipapo track from the album went on Power FM Zimbabwe gospel charts.

== Discography ==
=== Singles ===
- Like Heaven 2016
- Who Is There Like You 2016
- Praise Him 2016
- Friends in Christ 2017
- Mira Ipapo 2018
- Makomborero 2019
- I believe 2019

=== Albums ===
- Like Heaven 2016
- You are my God 2018
- Living in Victory EP 2019
- The Good News 2021

== Awards ==
- Gospel Artist of the year - Zimbabwe Music and Arts Awards (ZIMAA) 2016 (nomination)
- Best African Contemporary Living in Victory - Praisetek Gospel Music Awards (PGMA)
- Gospel Artist of the year - Zimbabwe British Entertainment Awards 2020
- Best Female Artist, Best Prophetic Song Living in Victory, Best Video Makomborero - Maranatha Gospel Music Awards USA 2021
