= Aylin Yıldızoğlu =

Turkish basketball player

Aylin Yıldızoğlu (born February 13, 1975, in İzmir, Turkey) is a Turkish female basketball player.

== Career ==
Aylin played 13 years for Ceyhan Municipality and then for Botaş Spor. In 2003, she won three titles with Botaş Spor in one season, Turkish Women's Basketball League championship, Turkey Cup and President’s Cup. In summer 2005, the captain of Botaş Spor transferred back to Ceyhan Municipality.

== International career ==
Yıldızoğlu played in the gold medal winning national team at the 2005 Mediterranean Games in Almería, Spain.

== Personal life ==
Since 1999, she is married to Ceyhun Yıldızoğlu, coach of Botaş Spor women’s team.

== See also ==
- Turkish women in sports
