= Ayla Kalkandelen =

Turkish entomologist

Dr. Ayla Kalkandelen
- Born: 14 March 1939; Gaziantep, Turkey
- Died: 28 April 2002 (aged 63)
- Education: Agriculture, zoology
- Alma mater: Ankara University, Clemson University
- Scientific career
- Fields: Entomology
- Thesis: (1971)

Ayla Kalkandelen (14 March 1939 – 28 April 2002) was a Turkish entomologist. Her specialty was in Auchenorrhyncha, a suborder of true bugs or insects order Homoptera. She described ten taxa and has five taxa named after her.

Ayla Kalkandelen was born in Gaziantep on 14 March 1939. She had an elder brother named Nejat. She completed her primary and secondary education in her hometown.

She graduated from the Department of Vineyard and horticulture production and rehabilitation in the Faculty of Agriculture at Ankara University in 1962. The same year, she was employed by the Research Institute for Agricultural Pest Control in Ankara.

After attending a course at the Georgetown Language School, Washington D.C. in 1964, she studied at Clemson University, South Carolina on an American scholarship between 1965 and 1966, graduating with a Master's degree.

During her stay in the United States, she was instructed in the taxonomy of Cicadellidae (leafhopper), a suborder of Homoptera, at Ohio State University in 1966 and National Museum of Natural History, Washington D.C. in 1967.

In November 1971, she received a PhD degree from the Department of Plant Protection at Ankara University for her thesis on Orta Anadolu'da Homoptera: Cicadellidae Familyası Türlerinin Taksonomisi Üzerine Araştırmalar ("Research on the Taxonomy of the Homoptera part Cicadellidae Family in Central Anatolia"). She was appointed associate professor at her alma mater in October 1995.

Between 1986 and 1990, Kalkandelen was editor-in-chief of the Turkish "Plant Protection Bulletin". Four taxa were named after her by the Czech taxonomist J. Diabola and one by German H. Hoch. The "Union of Chambers of Turkish Engineers and Architects" bestowed her one of its Service Award of 2002.

Kalkandelen retired in 1997. She died on 28 April 2002.

== Taxa defined by Kalkandelen ==
Cicadellidae (Homoptera)

- Diplocolenus (Verdanus) bekiri Kalkandelen, 1972
- Mocuellus dlabolai Kalkandelen, 1972
- Mocuellus foxi Kalkandelen, 1972
- Mocuellus zelihae Kalkandelen, 1972
- Paluda vitripennis lalahani Kalkandelen, 1972
- Zyginidia (Zyginidia) artvinicus Kalkandelen, 1985
- Zyginidia (Zyginidia) karadenizicus Kalkandelen, 1985
- Zyginidia (Zyginidia) bafranicus Kalkandelen, 1985
- Zyginidia (Zyginidia) emrea Kalkandelen, 1985

Delphacidae (Homoptera)

- Eurybregma dlabolai Kalkandelen, 1980

== Taxa named after Kalkandelen ==
Cicadellidae (Homoptera)

- Anoplotettix kalkandeleni Dlabola, 1971

Issidae (Homoptera)

- Tshurtshurnella kalkandelenica Dlabola, 1982
- Quadristylum aylae Dlabola, 1985

Derbidae (Homoptera)

- Malenia aylae Dlabola, 1983

Cixiidae (Homoptera)

- Hyalesthes aylanus Hoch, 1985
