= Baris Önes =

German politician (born 1985)

Member of the Hamburg Parliament
- Incumbent
- Assumed office 18 March 2020

Personal details
- Born: 9 May 1985 (age 41)
- Party: Social Democratic Party (since 2006)

Baris Önes (born 9 May 1985) is a German politician serving as a member of the Hamburg Parliament since 2020. He has served as chairman of the Social Democratic Party in Billstedt since 2021.
