= Güneş Yunus =

Turkish sports shooter

Personal information
- Born: 27 July 1942 (age 83)

Sport
- Sport: Sports shooting

Güneş Yunus (born 27 July 1942) is a Turkish former sports shooter. He competed at the 1972, 1976 and the 1984 Summer Olympics.
