= Tulay-e Pain =

Tulay-e Pain طولاي پايين
- Village
- Location within Iran
- Coordinates: 36°50′49″N 50°12′40″E
- Country: Iran
- Province: Gilan
- County: Rudsar
- Bakhsh: Rahimabad
- Rural District: Eshkevar-e Sofla

Population (2006)
  - Total: 58
- Time zone: UTC+3:30 (IRST)
  - Summer (DST): UTC+4:30 (IRDT)

Tulay-e Pain (Persian: طولاي پايين, also Romanized as Ţūlāy-e Pā’īn; also known as Ţīūlā-ye Pā’īn) is a village in Eshkevar-e Sofla Rural District, Rahimabad District, Rudsar County, Gilan Province, Iran. At the 2006 census, its population was 58, in 23 families.
