= Güneş Gürle =

Turkish opera singer, bass-baritone (born 1975)

Güneş Gürle (born July 7, 1975 in İzmir, Turkey) is a Turkish opera singer, bass-baritone.

== Career ==
Made his operatic debut at the State Opera Istanbul in the 2002-03 season as Don Giovanni in Mozart's masterpiece. Which led his career to Mozart roles such as Giovanni, Leporello, Figaro, Bartolo, Don Alfonso and Osmin.

He has performed under conductors such as Umberto Benedetti Michelangeli, Omar Meir Welber, Daniele Gatti, Paolo Carignani, Alexander Joel and Hans Wallat. He has sung at Theater an der Wien, Bavarian State Opera, Vlaamse Opera, Stadttheater Bern and Deutsche Oper am Rhein.

== Awards ==
Donizetti Classical Music Awards, Male Opera Singer of the Year 2013

Leyla Gencer Voice Competition, Jury Mention Award, 1997

== DVD ==
La bohème, as Colline, Robert Dornhelm as director, Opernfestspiele St. Margarethen
