= Günseli Başar =

Miss Turkey and Miss Europe winner (1932–2013)

- Born: 22 January 1932; Istanbul, Turkey
- Died: 20 April 2013 (aged 81); Istanbul, Turkey
- Children: 1
- Beauty pageant titleholder
- Title: Miss Turkey 1951; Miss Europe 1952
- Major competitions: Miss Turkey 1951 (Winner); Miss Europe 1952 (Winner)

Günseli Başar (22 January 1932 – 20 April 2013) was a Turkish beauty contestant and columnist who was crowned Miss Turkey 1951 and Miss Europe 1952.

== Biography ==
Başar was born on February 22, 1932, to an officer's family in Istanbul, where her father was stationed. However, her birth was registered some time later in Erzurum due to her father's transfer. Her great-grand uncle was Grand Vizier Halil Rifat Pasha, founder of the almshouse (Turkish: Darülaceze) in Istanbul and commissioner of the İzmir Clock Tower. She is of Rumelian Turkish, Circassian and Georgian descent.

Günseli Başar completed her secondary education at Erenköy Girls High School in Istanbul. While studying sculpture at the Fine Arts Academy in Istanbul, Günseli participated at a beauty pageant organized by the newspaper Cumhuriyet, and won the title Miss Turkey 1951 on October 13, 1951. The next year, she represented her country at the Miss Europe beauty contest held in Naples, Italy, and became Turkey's first ever Miss Europe winner on August 20, 1952.

She dropped out of her arts education, and at the age of 23, married Mehmet Kutsi Beğdeş, a charitable businessman. Günseli made her second marriage in 1959 to the Mayor of İzmir, Faruk Tunca. Both her marriages were short-lived. She has one daughter, Aslı, from her second marriage and two granddaughters.

In 1977, she accepted an offer from Erol Simavi, the owner of the daily newspaper Hürriyet, to write a column under the title "Günseli Oradaydı" (literally: "Günseli Was There") in order to finance her daughter's education abroad. After only one year of travelling across the country to write her column, she was involved in a traffic accident in which she was seriously injured. She underwent repeated operations on her head and arm. After recovering she did not return to her writing career.

Günseli Başar lived in Bodrum, Turkey until her death on 20 April 2013 at the age of 82.

Awards
Preceded by Nazire Hanım	Miss Turkey; 1951	Succeeded by Ayten Akyol
Preceded by (Austria) Hanni Schall	Miss Europe; 1952	Succeeded by (Italy) Eloisa Cianni
