= Vexillatio =

Temporary Roman army task forces detachments

A vexillatio (pl.: vexillationes) was a detachment of a Roman legion formed as a temporary task force created by the Roman army of the Principate. It was named from the standard carried by legionary detachments, the vexillum (pl.: vexilla), which bore the emblem and name of the parent legion.

Although commonly associated with legions, it is likely that vexillationes included auxiliaries. The term is found in the singular, referring to a single detachment, but is usually used in the plural to refer to an army made up of picked detachments. Vexillationes were assembled ad hoc to meet a crisis on Rome's extensive frontiers, to fight in a civil war, or to undertake an offensive against Rome's neighbours. They varied in size and composition, but usually consisted of about 1000 infantry and/or 500 cavalry.

== Purpose ==
Most of the Roman Army (around 400,000 strong at the beginning of the 3rd century) was stationed along the frontiers from the time of Hadrian, if not earlier. This placed the empire in a precarious position when serious threats arose in the interior or along a remote frontier. There was no central reserve and it was rarely possible to take a full legion, or even a major portion of one, to a troubled area without leaving a dangerous gap in the frontier defences. The only logical solution was to take detachments from different legions and form temporary task forces to deal with the threat. As soon as it was taken care of, these vexillationes were dissolved, and the detachments returned to their parent legions.

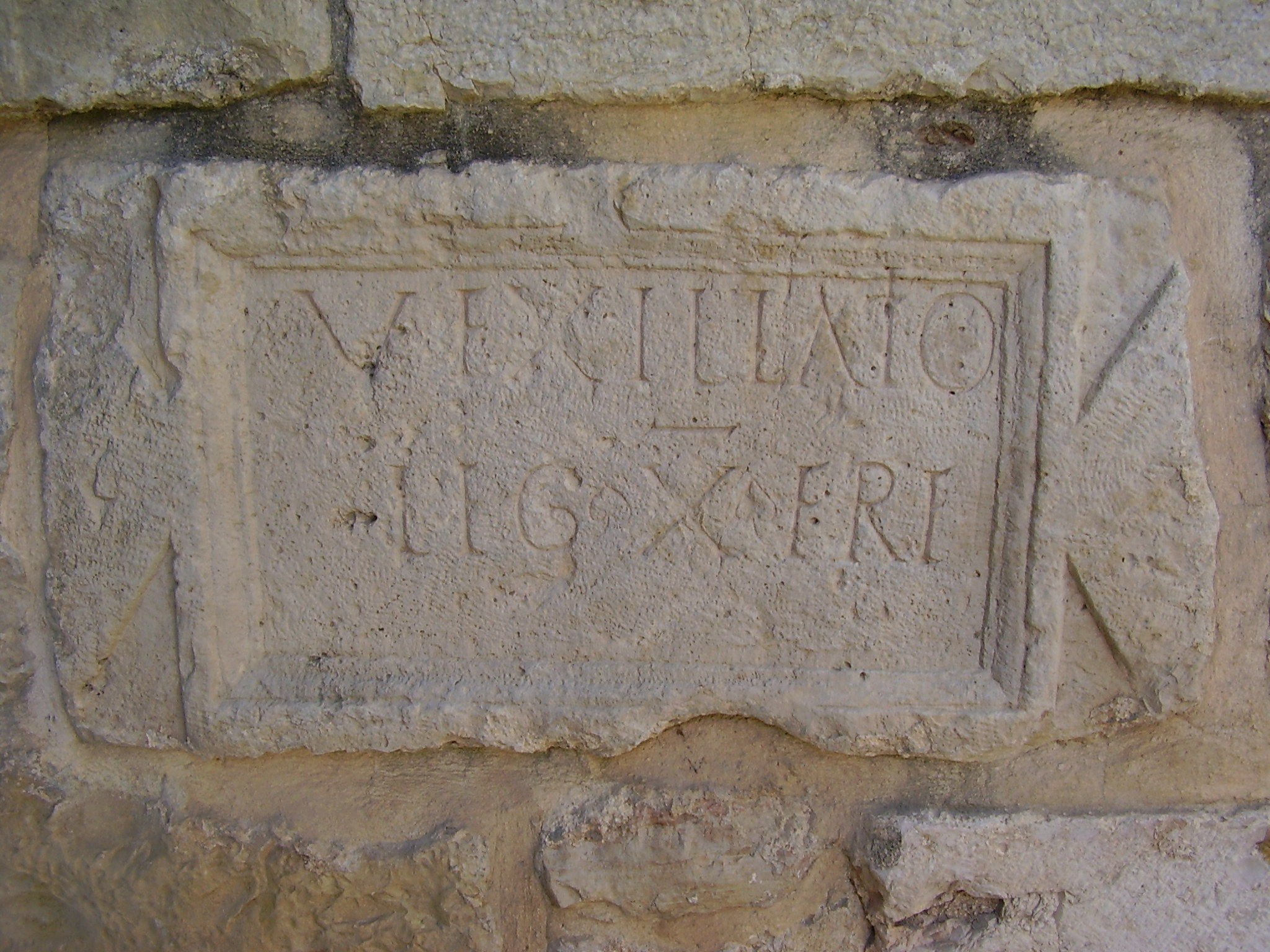
Inscription from Abu Ghosh in Israel mentioning a vexillatio of the Xth Roman Legion, Fretensis

The Roman emperors from the time of Augustus had at their disposal units in Italy and in the city of Rome. Over time these units would increase. Augustus created the praetorians who at the time of Domitianus constituted a force of ten cohorts, each of 1000 men strength on paper and who supplied a disputed number of horsemen. Traianus created the Imperial horseguards, the Equites Singulares Augusti, formed from his proconsular horseguard he had when he was the legate of Germania Inferior of about 1000 horsemen. Septimius made many changes in the Roman military. He doubled the number of the horseguards to 2000 horsemen. He filled the ranks of the Praetorians with provincial soldiers. He levied a new legion, Legio II Parthica, and for the first time in Roman history stationed it on the outskirts of Rome, making it more clear that the Roman emperor was a military dictator. Whenever the emperor went on campaign these guards units stationed in the city of Rome would accompany him. Added to these came the vexillationes of the border legions.

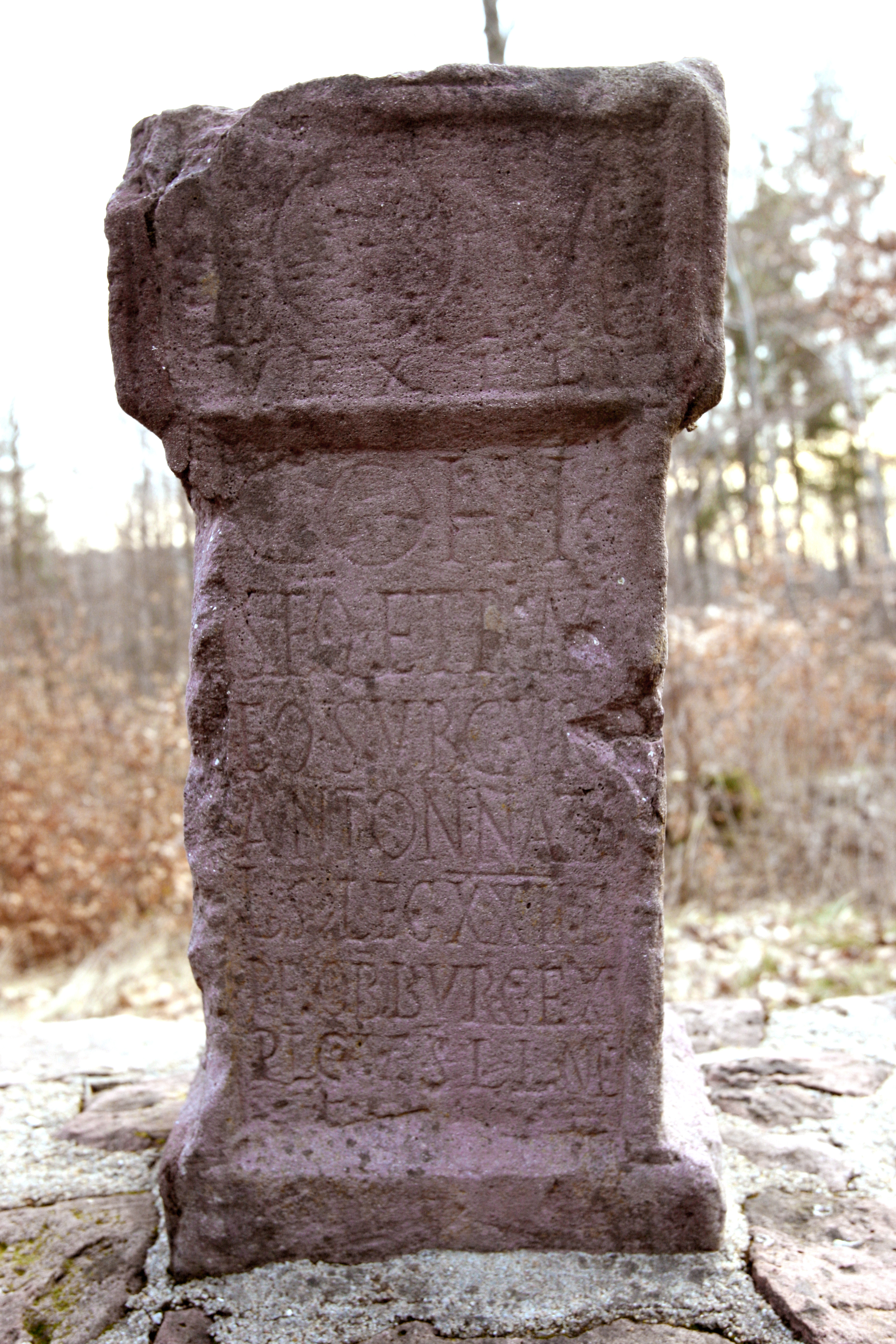
Votive altar in the Odenwald, Germany, dedicated to Jupiter Optimus Maximus (abbreviated IOM) by the vexillatio of the cavalry cohort of the Sequani and Raurici, associated with the 22nd Legion Primigenia Pia Fidelis

== Impact ==
The vexillatio system worked initially, due to the mobility provided by the empire's excellent roads and to the high levels of discipline, cohesion and esprit de corps of these units and the legions from which they came. But during the Crisis of the Third Century (a turbulent period from 235 to about 290) vexillationes were shifted so rapidly from one area to another that units became hopelessly mixed up and became de facto independent. Legions that would proclaim a commander as emperor could have a vexillatio in the real emperor's field army or garrisoned on the frontier. This was a major cause of disorganization in the Roman Army which resulted in sweeping military reforms under Diocletian and Constantine I where the basic army unit became the size of one (Quingenaria=500 Soldiers) or two (Milliaria=1000 Soldiers) cohorts instead of the 5000-man legion.

== Units ==
From the time of Diocletian and the Tetrarchy, and possibly as early as the reign of Gallienus, vexillationes were the usual cavalry units found on campaign though the ala remained. In the 4th century the Vexillationes palatinae and Vexilationes comitatenses of the Roman field armies are thought to have been either 300 or 600 men strong. The Notitia Dignitatum lists 88 vexillationes.

Other units, such as infantry cohortes and centuriae, and cavalry alae and turmae, may have had their own vexilla. In addition, vexillationes with their own vexilla would have designated units of special troops outside the usual military structure, such as vexillarii (re-enlisted veterans), who may have served separately from the cohorts of their ordinary comrades.

== Sources ==
- Dupuy, R.E.; Dupuy, T.N.. (1986). The Encyclopedia Of Military History: From 3500 B.C. To The Present (2nd Revised ed.). pp. 147–148.
- Southern, Pat; Dixon, Karen (1996). "Chapter 2". The Late Roman Army. ISBN 0-415-22296-6.
