= Tülay =

- Gender: Feminine
- Language: Turkish

Origin
- Language: Turkish
- Origin: "tülay"
- Derivation: "tülay"
- Meaning: dream-moon, moon halo

Other names
- See also: Tülin, Tülünay

Tülay is a common feminine Turkish given name. It means dream-moon or moon halo. It also seems likely to be associated with the Tolunay/Dolunay (full moon).

== People ==
- Tülay Adalı, Turkish-American electrical engineer
- Tülay Babuşcu (born 1976), Turkish politician
- Tülay German (born 1935), Turkish pop folk singer
- Tülay Hatimoğulları (born 1977), Turkish linguistic rights activist and politician
- Tülay Karaca, Turkish belly dancer
- Tülay Keçialan (born 1965), Turkish pop singer, better known as Asya
- Tülay Özer (1946–2026), Turkish singer
- Tülay Tuğcu (born 1942), Turkish high-ranked judge
