= Fevziye Rahgozar Barlas =

Afghan poet, and short story writer

Fevziye Rahgozar Barlas (born 1955 in Balkh) is an Afghan poet and short story writer.

== Life ==
She is the daughter of Shafee Rahgozar. She graduated high school in Kabul, and married Rai Barlas. She graduated from Istanbul University in 1977. She worked for the Minister for Information and Culture. In 1979, she went into exile. She was a Senior Editor and News Anchor, Radio Free Europe/Radio Liberty. She graduated from University of Washington with an MA in Persian language and literature in 1996.

== Works ==
- Dayer-e Shegeftiha (Wonderland), 1999
- The Heavens are my Father, 2001
- Wondering Eyes
