= Ali Barlas =

Turkish politician

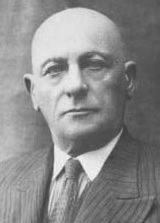

Member of the Grand National Assembly

Personal details
- Born: 1869 Constantinople, Ottoman Empire
- Died: 15 March 1953 (aged 83–84)

Ali Barlas, also known as Ali Çavlum (1869 – 15 March 1953) was a Turkish politician of liberal signature, who was an official of the Freedom and Accord Party. He later joined the CHP when the Turkish Republic was proclaimed.
