= Tulay-e Bala =

Tulay-e Bala طولاي بالا
- Village
- Location within Iran
- Coordinates: 36°50′47″N 50°10′37″E
- Country: Iran
- Province: Gilan
- County: Rudsar
- Bakhsh: Rahimabad
- Rural District: Eshkevar-e Sofla

Population (2006)
  - Total: 134
- Time zone: UTC+3:30 (IRST)
  - Summer (DST): UTC+4:30 (IRDT)

Tulay-e Bala (Persian: طولاي بالا, also Romanized as Ţūlāy-e Bālā; also known as Ţīūlā-ye Bālā) is a village in Eshkevar-e Sofla Rural District, Rahimabad District, Rudsar County, Gilan Province, Iran. At the 2006 census, its population was 134, in 52 families.
