= Barla (surname) =

Barla is a surname. Notable people with the surname include:

- Dayamani Barla (21st century), Indian journalist
- Lazarus Barla (born 1979), Indian field hockey player
- Luca Barla (born 1987), Italian road bicycle racer
- Mihály Barla (1778–1824), Slovenian Lutheran pastor, writer, and poet

Barla Surname belongs to the Munda Tribe (Jharkhand India). Meaning of Barla in Munda is 'Baniyan Tree'.
