= Erendiz Atasü =

Turkish author and writer

- Occupations: Novelist; essayist; short story writer; professor of pharmacognosy
- Spouse: Dr. Ergin Atasü (1978–1984)
- Children: Dr. Reyhan Atasü – Topcuoğlu
- Writing career
- Notable works: Kadınlar da Vardır (Women also Exist); Dağın Öteki Yüzü (The Other Side of the Mountain); Taş Üstüne Gül Oyması (Roses Engraved in Marble); Bir Yaşdönümü Rüyası (A Midlife Dream); Hayatın En Mutlu An'ı (Happiest Moment of Life); Güneş Saygılı'nın Gerçek Yaşamı (The Real Life of Güneş Saygılı); Dün ve Ferda(Yesterday and Ferda)

Erendiz Atasü (born 1947) is a Turkish feminist author, notable for her novels, short stories and essays; also a previous academic.

== Early life ==
Born in Ankara in 1947, as the only child of mathematician Faik Sayron and English literature instructor Hadiye Sayron, she was educated in Ankara College and the Faculty of Pharmacy, Ankara University, where she continued as a doctorate student (ph.D in 1974) and subsequently became a professor of pharmacognosy (1988), and taught until her early retirement in 1997. Since then she has been a freelance writer. The year she spent at London University in the early 1970s as a British Council scholar was crucial in the process of her transformation into a literary figure. She later declared that during that year she thought a lot about the complexities of the positions of women in Western and Middle Eastern societies respectively.

== Literary career ==
Erendiz Atasü started writing in 1972 in London, but was in no hurry of publishing. Her first short story collection Kadınlar da Vardır (Women also Exist) appeared in 1983 after receiving the "Akademi Kitabevi" award. Four more short story collections were published up to 1995, when her first and acclaimed novel Dağın Öteki Yüzü (The Other Side of the Mountain)—outwardly a family history—in which she discusses the endeavour and the attainments of the Republican revolution, as well as its shortcomings from the standpoints of women, appeared. A modernist in her themes and messages, she likes to experiment with literary genres, bordering on postmodernist styles. Up to now she has published six novels, eight collections of short stories, and seven collections of essays. Especially in her essays she is an advocate of women's rights and secular society. She also publishes essays of literary criticism. She has won various prestigious awards of Turkish literary circles.

== Works ==
- Kadınlar da Vardır, Varlık Yayınları, 1983, ISBN 9789750733581
- Uy Karadeniz Uy (Lanetliler), De Yayın, 1985, ISBN 9789754947076
- Dullara Yas Yakışır, Afa Yayınları, 1988, ISBN 9752899854
- Onunla Güzeldim, Afa Yayınları, 1991, ISBN 9754946760
- Dağın Öteki Yüzü, Remzi Kitabevi, 1995, ISBN 9752894933
- Taş Üstüne Gül Oyması, Bilgi Yayınevi, 1997, ISBN 6051415793
- Uçu, Bilgi Yayınevi, 1998, ISBN 9789750726262
- Gençliğin O Yakıcı Mevsimi, Bilgi Yayınevi, 1999, ISBN 978-975-07-2867-9
- Benim Yazarlarım, Bilgi Yayınevi, 2000, ISBN 9789750726255
- Kadınlığım, Yazarlığım, Yurdum, Bilgi Yayınevi, 2001, ISBN 9750736400
- Bir Yaşdönümü Rüyası, Can Yayınları, 2002, ISBN 9752895662
- İmgelerin İzi, Can Yayınları, 2003, ISBN 9750703464
- Kavram ve Slogan, Can Yayınları, 2004, ISBN 9750703693
- Açıkoturumlar Çağı, Epsilon Yayınevi, 2006, ISBN 9752896669
- İncir Ağacının Ölümü, Everest Yayınları, 2008, ISBN 9752894925
- Düşünce Sefaletinin Kıskacında, İmge Yayınları, 2008, ISBN 9755335862
- Bilinçle Beden Arasındaki Uzaklık, Everest Yayınları, 2009, ISBN 9752895824
- Hayatın En Mutlu An’ı, Everest Yayınları, 2010, ISBN 9752897282
- Güneş Saygılı’nın Gerçek Yaşamı, Everest Yayınları, 2011, ISBN 9752899501
- Yıllar Geçerken: Hayat ve Roman, Everest Yayınları, 2013, ISBN 6051416277
- Dün ve Ferda, Can Yayınları, 2013, ISBN 9789750719028
- Kızıl Kale, Can Yayınları, 2015, ISBN 9789750725210
- Saldırganı Hoş Tutmak, Can Yayınları 2015, ISBN 9789750726286
- Baharat Ülkesi'nin Hazin Tarihi, Can Yayınları, 2016, ISBN 9789750733383
- Şairin Ölümü, Can Yayınları, 2019, ISBN 9789750740893
- Türk Romanında Bir Gezinti, Can Yayınları, 2019, ISBN 9789750740909

== Translated works ==
- The other side of the mountain. London: Milet, 2000. Çevirmen: Elizabeth Maslen. ISBN 1840591137
- Das Lied des Meeres: Erzählungen. Frankfurt am Main Literaturca Verlag, 2004. Çevirmen: Christel Schütte. ISBN 3935535074
- on Eipo Sthan Klimakthrio. Dardanos, Athens, 2005. Çevirmen: Anthi Karra.
- A midlife dream. Rudgwick, Horsham: Milet Publishing, 2013. Çevirmen: Alvin Parmar. ISBN 9781840597684
- Die andere Seite des Berges. Frankfurt am Main Literaturca Verlag, 2018. Çevirmen: Beatrix Caner. ISBN 9783935535380

Various short stories of Erendiz Atasü have been included in the below anthologies:

- Aufbruch aus dem Schweigen, ed. by H. Hegghard and Ü. Güney, Buntbuch, Hamburg, 1984
- Stemmen uit de Schaduw, ed. By D.Poppinga, J. de Bakker R. Van Leeuwen, Het Wereldvenster, 1986
- Twenty Stories by Turkish Women Writers, trans by Nilüfer M. Reddy, Indiana University Press, 1988
- Zeit-genössische Türkische Erzahlungen, trans. and ed. By Wolfgang Riemann, dtv, Munich, 1990
- Deux Pieces D'Or, trans. by Mustafa Yalçıner, Onur yayınlar, Ankara 1991
- Paroles Devoilees, ed. by Nedim Gürsel, Unesco, 1993
- Moderne Türkische Erzahlungen, trans. and ed. By Wolfgang Riemann, dtv, Munich, 2004
- Liebe, Lügen und Gespenster, ed. by B. Sagaster, Unionverlag, Zurich, 2006
- Storie d'aria, d'terra, d'acqua e di fuoco, ed. By E. Chiavetta and S. Fernandez, Rubbettino, 2007
- Zgodbe iz Turcıje, ed. Feridun Andaç, Sodobnost International, Ljubljana, 2008
- Alles Blaue, Alles Grüne Dieser Welt, trans. and ed. By Beatrix Caner, dtv, Munich 2008
- A Contemporary Turkish Short Fiction Vol I, ed. by Suat Karantay, Nettleberry LLC, St. Eden, S. Dakota, 2009
- İstanbul Erzahlt, trans. and ed. by Wolfgang Riemann, dtv, München, 2010
- İstanbul in Women's Stories, ed. by H. Öğüt, Milet publishing, 2012
- Europe in Women's Short Stories from Turkey, ed. by Gültekin Emre, Milet Publishing, Sussex, 2012

== Interpretations ==
Atasü first drew attention with her bold interpretations of women's lives and circumstances set in realistic surroundings, but expressed in poetic styles. She was a new voice among her contemporaries. Her novels are considered to witness the social changes Turkey underwent throughout the scope of twentieth century from an individualistic and feministic view. Her work has been acclaimed both as narrations of history, and as analysis of female sexuality.

Critic Yıldız Ecevit claims that Erendiz Atasü constructs her novels on dichotomies; and declares The Other Side of the Mountain to be an esthetization of Kemalism; whereas Çimen Günay points out that it is a feminist interpretation of the foundation of the Turkish republic. Tom Holland, writing on the English translation, finds the novel "profoundly Turkish and yet also so creatively aware of European literary models" and claims that "it shows Turkey's soul". Tharaud, on the other hand, takes rather a critical view of the said work, whereas others emphasise its historical themes, and Doltaş, and Batum-Menteşe review it as a narration of history.

Critic Ayşegül Yüksel agrees in a way with the concept of dichotomies, but she is more precise and claims that Erendiz Atasü creates literature from the tension between contradictions; and that in her work an impartial scientific observation merges with a strong vein of emotion and empathy; and that the writer feels free in resorting to whatever literary tools she finds becoming her themes.

Mine Özyurt interperates Atasü's work as female novels of awakening based on the discovery of the hidden self, opposing the male bildungsroman where the protagonist merely acquires life experience.

Dilek Direnç elaborates the idea of bildungsroman in Atasü's case, approaching her novels as examples of künstlerroman; and drawing attention to such themes in Atasü's work as artistic creativity, and to her protagonists who experience self-discovery parallel to the act of writing. Critics observe that her work has taken a turn towards dystopia in which she merges realism with fantasy to represent the chaotic situation of Turkey which has fallen under the influence of Islamic radicalism.

Papatya Alkan GENCE gives a concise biography of the author and a report of how her works have been received in Dictionary of Literary Biography (vol. 373), Turkish novelists since 1960.

== Ideas on women's literature ==
Atasü describes writing as her means of feeling alive and struggling as well as her sanctuary. According to her, humanity needs to hear life experiences of women, who have been the silenced half of humanity throughout ages, told by women's authentic words. She emphasises that the strong point of women's literature is not relating women's agonies, but taking a critical view of the influences of patriarchy on society and on the individual, especially when it functions in non-overt ways.
