= Barış Aysu =

Turkish footballer

Barış
Personal information
- Full name: Barış Aysu
- Date of birth: May 10, 1992 (age 34)
- Place of birth: Ordu, Turkey
- Position: Defender

Team information
- Current team: Halide Edip Adivarspor

Youth career
- 2005–2006: Damlaspor
- 2006–2010: Tepebag Kültürspor
- 2010–2012: Karabükspor

Senior career*
Years	Team	Apps	(Gls)
2010–2014	Karabükspor	?	(?)
2012–2013	→ Istanbulspor (loan)	3	(0)
2013–2014	→ Orhangazispor (loan)	5	(1)
2014	→ 1930 Bafraspor (loan)	4	(0)
2014–2015	Cizrespor	6	(0)
2015	Kaptan Yenicespor	?	(?)
2015–	Halide Edip Adivarspor	0	(0)
- * Club domestic league appearances and goals as of 3 August 2015

Barış Aysu (born 10 May 1992) is a Turkish footballer who plays as a defender for Halide Edip Adivarspor.
