= David Houser =

Former American football player(born c. 1956)

Profile
- Positions: Wide receiver, defensive back, punt returner

Personal information
- Listed height: 6 ft 0 in (1.83 m)
- Listed weight: 185 lb (84 kg)

Career information
- High school: Sunset (Dallas, TX)
- College: Rice (1974,1976–1978)

Career history
- Cincinnati Bengals (1979)*
- * Offseason or practice squad member only

Awards and highlights
- Rice most valuable player, 1977, 1978

David Houser (born c. 1956) is a former American football wide receiver, defensive back, and punt returner. He played college football for the Rice Owls in 1974 and from 1976 to 1978. As a sophomore, he sustained an ankle injury that required three major operations and left three screws in his ankle for eight months. He missed the entire 1975 season due to the injury. Though lacking outstanding speed and size, he won a reputation for running excellent routes and having "superb hands and an uncanny ability to catch the ball in crowds." In 1976, he led the Southwest Conference (SWC) and ranked sixth nationally with 931 receptions. The following year, he ranked second in the SWC with 795 receiving yards. He also set a Rice record that still stands as of 2026 with 14 catches in a game in 1976. His career total of 2,358 receiving yards was a Rice record and ranked third in SWC history when his career ended. His tally of 196 receiving yards against Florida in 1976 was also a Rice record until 2008 when James Casey tallied 208 yards in a game. Houser received the George Martin Award as the school's most valuable football player for two consecutive seasons. He was signed as a free agent by the Cincinnati Bengals in May 1979, but he did not play in the regular season.

== See also ==
- Rice Owls football statistical leaders
