= Tülin =

- Pronunciation: Turkish pronunciation: [tylin]
- Gender: Female

Origin
- Language: Turkish
- Meaning: "Halo around the moon", "Mirror"

Other names
- Related names: Ayla, Aylin

Tülin is a common feminine Turkish given name. In Turkish, "Tülin" means "Halo around the moon". "Tülin", "Aylin", and "Ayla" are synonymous given names. Beside that meaning, "Tülin" also means "Mirror", according to TDK (Türk Dil Kurumu).

== People ==
- Tülin Altıntaş (born 1982), Turkish volleyball player.
- Tülin Özen, Turkish actress
- Tülin Şahin (born 1980), a Turkish fashion designer, TV presenter, actress, author and top model
