= Aysu Keskin =

Turkish basketball player

Aysu Keskin (born May 15, 1990 in Istanbul) is a Turkish female basketball player. She plays for Fenerbahçe S.K. as guard position. Keskin is 177 cm tall.

== See also ==
- Turkish women in sports
