= Aylin =

- Gender: Female

Origin
- Language: Turkish
- Meaning: "Moon halo", "the one that belongs to the moon"

Other names
- Related names: Ailin, Ayla, Tülin

Aylin (Turkish pronunciation: [ˈajlin]), also spelled in other languages as Aelyn, Aelin, Ailin, Ailyn, Ailynn, Aylinn and Eylin, is a female Turkish given name. It is sometimes used as a given name in the English-speaking world in modern times. The name Aylin means "moon halo" or "the one that belongs to the moon". Other related names are Ayla and Tülin. It is not related to the similar Irish names Aileen, Ayleen, Eileen.

== People ==
- Aylin Aslım (born 1976), Turkish singer/songwriter
- Aylin Daşdelen (born 1982), European champion Turkish female weightlifter
- Aylin Ibarra (born 2002), Mexican rower
- Aylin Kösetürk (born 1993), Austrian fashion model of Turkish descent
- Aylin Langreuter (born 1976), German conceptual artist
- Aylín Mújica (born 1974), Cuban actress, model, and ballet dancer
- Aylin Yıldızoğlu (born 1975), Turkish female basketball player
- Aylin Nazlıaka (born 1968), Turkish businesswoman, politician, and MP with the Republican People's Party (CHP)
- Aylin Sarıoğlu (born 1995), Turkish volleyball player
- Ailin Salas (born 1993), Argentinian-Brazilian actress
- Aylin Tezel (born 1983), German actress
- Aylin Uysalcan (born 2009), Turkish volleyball player
- Aylin Yaman (born 1967), Turkish physician and politician
- Aylin Yaren (born 1989), German-Turkish female football player
- Aylin Yener, Turkish-American professor
- Aylin Yıldızoğlu (born 1975), Turkish female basketball player
- Süreyya Aylin Antmen (born 1981), contemporary Turkish poet and writer

== Fictional characters ==
- Aylin Devrimel (1938–1995), protagonist of Ayşe Kulin's novel Adı: Aylin
- Dame Aylin, a character in the role-playing video game Baldur's Gate 3
