= Aybike =

- Gender: Female

Origin
- Language: Turkish
- Meaning: A combination of words Ay moon and Bike (or Büke) princess, woman

Other names
- Related names: Aybüke, Bike, Büke, İsenbike, Süyümbike

Aybike is a common Turkish given name. The name is produced by using two Turkish words: Ay and Bike. In Turkish, "Ay" means "Moon" and "Bike" means "Princess" and/or "Woman". Therefore, it means "a (princess) woman as beautiful as the moon" or "a (princess) woman who has a face as beautiful as the moon"

== Real People ==
- Lisa Aybike Kir, professional model and actress living in Denmark.
- Aybike Kahraman, a skater competing in Triglav Trophy and Turkish Figure Skating Championships.
- Aybike Serttaş Ertike, a Turkish author writing about television and advertisement.
