= Ayla (name) =

- Pronunciation: [eye-lah] or a-luh
- Gender: Female

Origin
- Origin: Turkish
- Meaning: Turkish: "Halo of light around the moon (or the sun)"

Other names
- Related names: Aila, Ajla, Ayala, Ayelet, Aylin, Aylanur, Éala, Eila, Eyla, Ela
- Meanings in other languages include "Terebinth tree" or "Oak tree" in Hebrew, and "Swan" in Irish.

Ayla is a common feminine Turkish given name.

== Turkish ==
In Turkish the name Ayla is commonly said to mean "halo of light around the moon".

Ayla is usually used as synonymous with "moonlight", although it could also mean "halo" in general. "Ay" means "moon" in Turkish, so "Ayla" means the "halo around the moon." "Ayla" also means "with the moon" as a word ("ay" + "la" where "la" is used for "ile" which means "with" in Turkish). However, in the context of given names, its meaning is halo, and can be related to names Aylin (also deriving from "ay"), Tülin, or Aylanur.

== Hebrew ==
In Hebrew the name Ayla is commonly said to mean "terebinth tree" or "oak tree" from the words "ela/אֵלָה" and "alon/אַלּוֹן" respectively. It has also been attributed to "doe", "gazelle", or "deer" from the words "ayala/אַיָּלָה" and "ayelet/אַיֶלֶת".

== Homonyms ==
Aila is a homophonous name in Finnish (equivalent of Helga or Olga) meaning "bringer of light", and in Scottish Gaelic meaning "from a strong and resilient place". The Irish feminine name Éala, which might be influenced by eala, the Irish word for swan, can also be homophonous if pronounced with a long a, with the addition of the síneadh fada.

Ayla is sometimes falsely identified as a variant of feminine Arabic name "Aliya" meaning "sublime" or "large". "Aliya" or "Aaliyah" is actually the female form of "Ali" or "Aali" and is an unrelated name. The Turkish variant of "Aaliyah" is closer to "Aliye" not "Ayla."

== People ==
- Ayla (producer) [Ingo Kunzi] (born 1966), German producer and DJ.
- Ayla Akat Ata (born 1976), lawyer and politician.
- Ayla Aksu (born 1996), Turkish-American tennis player.
- Ayla Algan (1937–2024), Turkish film/stage actress and singer.
- Ayla Arslancan (1936–2015), Turkish actress.
- Ayla Brown (born 1988), American artist and former NCAA basketball player.
- Ayla Dikmen (1944–1990), Turkish singer.
- Ayla Erduran (1934–2025), Turkish violin player.
- Ayla Guzzardo, American college basketball coach
- Ayla Halit Kazım (born 1934), Turkish Cypriot former politician.
- Ayla Huser (born 1992), Swiss badminton player.
- Ayla Kalkandelen (1939–2002), Turkish entomologist.
- Ayla Kell (born 1990), American actress and former dancer.
- Ayla Malik (born 1970), Pakistani politician and journalist.
- Ayla Peksoylu [ANGEL-I'], UK-born singer, songwriter, actress, and professional model.
- Ayla Reynolds (2010–2011), missing American child.
- Safiye Ayla Targan (1907-1998), singer of Turkish classical music.

=== Fictional people ===
- Ayla, a character from the book series Earth's Children.
- Ayla, played by Daryl Hannah in the 1986 film The Clan of the Cave Bear based on the novel of the same name in the Earth's Children series by Jean Auel.
- Ayla Ranzz, a character from DC Comics.
- Ayla, a character from the video game Chrono Trigger.
- Ayla, a young Korean girl in the eponymous 2017 Turkish drama film, nicknamed as such by a Turkish soldier because she was found in moonlight.
- Ayla Valença, a character from the Ordem Paranormall TTRPG series.

== See also ==
- Ayla (disambiguation)
