= Ayda (name) =

- Gender: Female
- Language: Turkish

Origin
- Language: Turkic

Ayda is a female Turkish given name. In Turkish, it means "in the moon".

== People ==
=== Given name ===
- Ayda Field (born 1979), Turkish-American television actress
- Ayda Aksel (born 1962), Turkish actress
- Ayda Jebat (born 1992), Malaysian singer and actress

=== Surname ===
- Adile Ayda (1912–1992), first woman career diplomat of Turkey
