= Aysel =

- Gender: Female

Origin
- Languages: Turkish; Azerbaijani
- Meaning: moon beauty, beautiful moon

Other names
- Related names: Nursel, Günseli, Tansel

Aysel is a feminine Turkish given name popular in Turkey and Azerbaijan. In Turkish, "Aysel" comes from Ay-sili and means beautiful moon or moon beauty.

== People ==
- Aysel Baykal (1939–2003), Turkish jurist
- Aysel Çelikel (born 1933), Turkish academic
- Aysel Ekşi (1934–2015), Turkish psychiatrist
- Aysel Gürel (1929–2008), Turkish lyricist
- Aysel Mammadova (born 1989), Azerbaijani singer known as AISEL
- Aysel Manafova (born 1990), Miss Azerbaijan in 2013
- Aysel Önder (born 2005), Turkish Paralympian athlete
- Aysel Özakın, Turkish-British novelist
- Aysel Özgan (born 1978), Turkish Paralympic shooter
- Aysel Özkan (born 2002), Turkish weightlifter
- Aysel Taş (born 1964), Bulgarian born Turkish javelin thrower
- Aysel Teymurzadeh (born 1989), Azerbaijani pop and R&B singer
- Aysel Tuğluk (born 1965), Turkish politician of Kurdish descent
- Aysel Umudova (born 1992), Azerbaijani journalist
