= Aydan =

Aydan (pronounced [ˈajdan]) is a Guanche and Irish male name or Turkish and Azerbaijani feminine given name and surname.

The Irish male name is derived from the name Aodhán, which is a pet form of Aodh. The personal name Aodh means "fiery" and/or "bringer of fire" and was the name of a Celtic sun god (see Aed).

Formerly common only in Ireland and Scotland, the name and its variants have become popular in England, the United States, and Canada. Aidan has been the 57th most popular name in the United States since the start of the year 2000, bestowed on over 62,000 boys, while Aiden ranking 66th, has been used on over 51,000 boys. Other variants are a bit less popular, such as Hayden 88th, Ayden 189th, Aden 333rd, Aydan 808th, and Aydin 960th, according to the United States Social Security Database. "Aidan/Aiden" was the most popular boys' name in Canada in 2007.

The Guanche male name can be roughly translated as "he who lives underwater".

The Turkish and Azerbaijani feminine given name literally means "from the moon" ("ay": moon, and -dan is a suffix meaning "from"). Figuratively, it means made of the moon or the one that comes from the moon.

Aydan is also a Turkish geographical name, notable the modern town in Anatolia (Asian Turkey), near the Ancient Roman city and bishopric and present Latin Catholic titular see of Attanus

== Given name ==
- Aydan Calafiore (born 2000), Australian singer
- Aydan Hojjatova (born 1999), Azerbaijani chess player
- Aydan Özoğuz (born 1967), German politician of Turkish descent
- Aidan Salahova (born 1964), Azerbaijani artist
- Aydan Siyavuş (1947–1998), Turkish basketball coach
- Aydan Şener (born 1963), Turkish film and television actress
- Aydan White, American football player

== Surname ==
- Ayhan Aydan (1924–2009), Turkish opera singer
- Efe Aydan (born 1955), Turkish former professional basketball player
