= Aybüke =

- Gender: Female

Origin
- Language: Turkish
- Meaning: A combination of words Ay moon and Büke queen, Clever, Dragon

Other names
- Related names: Aybike, Bike, Büke

Aybüke is a common feminine Turkish given name. The name has the meaning "very intelligent woman (queen), as beautiful and bright as the moon".

"büke" is an ancient Turkic mythological dragon that is the protector, warrior and the defender of the moon. In the old Turkic language "ü" and "ö" are the same letter. It is said in the folklore that they named the moon's reflection on the water "böke", which is also the root of the word "bükmek" (to bend) in Turkish. Therefore the meaning of the name is the moon dragon and/or the moon bender.

- Aybüke Aktuna (born 1994), Turkish archer
- Aybüke Arslan (born 1994), Turkish footballer
- Aybüke Gümrükçü (born 1998), Turkish archer
- Aybüke Pusat (born in 1995), Turkish beauty pageant
