= Gladiator =

Roman combatant for entertainment

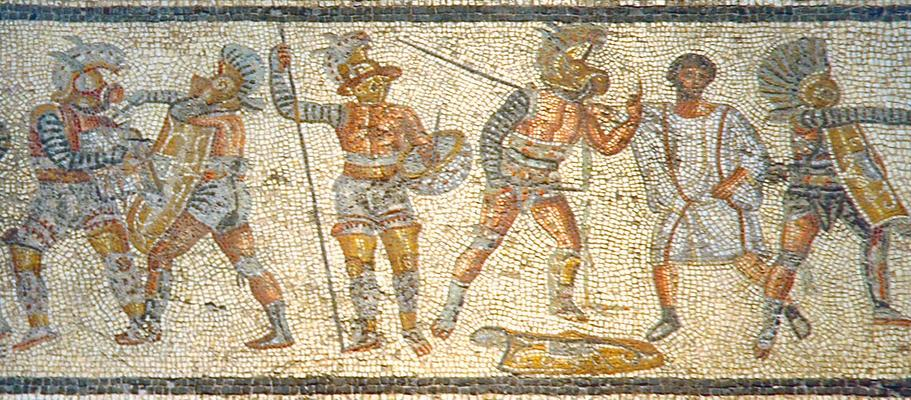
Part of the Zliten mosaic from Libya (Leptis Magna), about 2nd century AD. It shows (left to right) a thraex fighting a murmillo, a hoplomachus standing with another murmillo (who is signaling his defeat to the referee), and one of a matched pair.

A gladiator (Latin: gladiator 'swordsman', from Latin gladius 'sword') was an armed combatant who entertained audiences in the Roman Republic and Roman Empire in violent confrontations with other gladiators, wild animals, and condemned criminals. Some gladiators were volunteers who risked their lives and their legal and social standing by appearing in the arena. Most were despised as slaves, schooled under harsh conditions, socially marginalized, and segregated even in death.

Irrespective of their origin, gladiators offered spectators an example of Rome's martial ethics and, in fighting or dying well, they could inspire admiration and popular acclaim. They were celebrated in high and low art, and their value as entertainers was commemorated in precious and commonplace objects throughout the Roman world.

The origin of gladiatorial combat is open to debate. There is evidence of it in funeral rites during the Punic Wars of the 3rd century BC, and thereafter it rapidly became an essential feature of politics and social life in the Roman world. Its popularity led to its use in ever more lavish and costly games.

The gladiator games lasted for nearly a thousand years, reaching their peak between the 1st century BC and the 2nd century AD.

== History ==
=== Origins ===
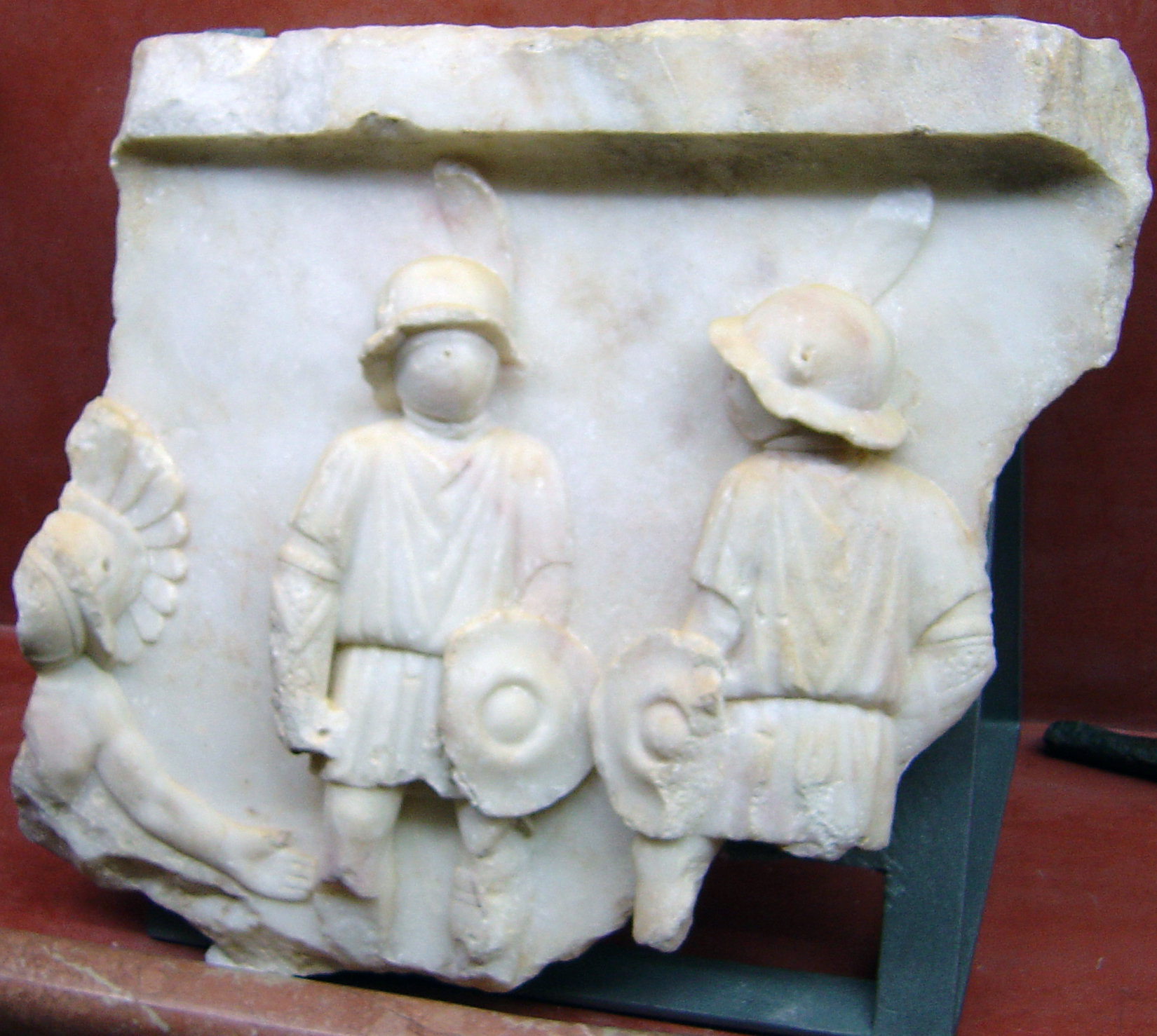
Relief of gladiators from Amphitheatre of Mérida, Spain

Early literary sources seldom agree on the origins of gladiators and the gladiator games. In the late 1st century BC, Nicolaus of Damascus believed they were Etruscan. Around the same time, Livy wrote that they were first held in 310 BC by the Campanians in celebration of their victory over the Samnites. Long after the games had ceased, the 7th century AD writer Isidore of Seville derived Latin lanista (manager of gladiators) from the Etruscan word for "executioner", and the title of "Charon" (an official who accompanied the dead from the Roman gladiatorial arena) from Charun, psychopomp of the Etruscan underworld. This was accepted and repeated in most early modern, standard histories of the games.

For some modern scholars, reappraisal of pictorial evidence supports a Campanian origin, or at least a borrowing, for the games and gladiators. Campania hosted the earliest known gladiator schools (ludi). Tomb frescoes from the Campanian city of Paestum (4th century BC) show paired fighters, with helmets, spears and shields, in a propitiatory funeral blood-rite that anticipates early Roman gladiator games. Compared to these images, supporting evidence from Etruscan tomb-paintings is tentative and late. The Paestum frescoes may represent the continuation of a much older tradition, acquired or inherited from Greek colonists of the 8th century BC.

Livy places the first Roman gladiator games (264 BC) in the early stage of Rome's First Punic War, against Carthage, when Decimus Junius Brutus Scaeva had three gladiator pairs fight to the death in Rome's "cattle market" forum (Forum Boarium) to honor his dead father, Brutus Pera. Livy describes this as a "munus" (plural: munera), a gift, in this case a commemorative duty owed the manes (spirit, or shade) of a dead ancestor by his descendants. The development of the gladiator munus and its gladiator types was most strongly influenced by Samnium's support for Hannibal and the subsequent punitive expeditions against the Samnites by Rome and its Campanian allies; the earliest, most frequently mentioned and probably most popular type was the Samnite.

To quote Livy:

The war in Samnium, immediately afterwards, was attended with equal danger and an equally glorious conclusion. The enemy, besides their other warlike preparation, had made their battle-line to glitter with new and splendid arms. There were two corps: the shields of the one were inlaid with gold, of the other with silver ... The Romans had already heard of these splendid accoutrements, but their generals had taught them that a soldier should be rough to look on, not adorned with gold and silver but putting his trust in iron and in courage ... The Dictator, as decreed by the senate, celebrated a triumph, in which by far the finest show was afforded by the captured armour. So the Romans made use of the splendid armour of their enemies to do honour to their gods; while the Campanians, in consequence of their pride and in hatred of the Samnites, equipped after this fashion the gladiators who furnished them entertainment at their feasts, and bestowed on them the name Samnites.

Livy's account skirts the funereal, sacrificial function of early Roman gladiator combats and reflects the later theatrical ethos of the Roman gladiator show: splendidly, exotically armed and armoured barbarians, treacherous and degenerate, are dominated by Roman iron and native courage. His plain Romans virtuously dedicate the magnificent spoils of war to the gods. Their Campanian allies stage a dinner entertainment using gladiators who may not be Samnites, but play the Samnite role. Other groups and tribes would join the cast list as Roman territories expanded. Most gladiators were armed and armoured in the manner of the enemies of Rome. The gladiator munus became a morally instructive form of historic enactment in which the only honourable option for the gladiator was to fight well, or else die well.

=== Development ===
In 216 BC, Marcus Aemilius Lepidus, late consul and augur, was honoured by his sons with three days of munera gladiatoria in the Forum Romanum, using twenty-two pairs of gladiators. Ten years later, Scipio Africanus gave a commemorative munus in Iberia for his father and uncle, casualties in the Punic Wars. High status non-Romans, and possibly Romans too, volunteered as his gladiators. The context of the Punic Wars and Rome's near-disastrous defeat at the Battle of Cannae (216 BC) link these early games to munificence, the celebration of military victory and the religious expiation of military disaster; these munera appear to serve a morale-raising agenda in an era of military threat and expansion. The next recorded munus, held for the funeral of Publius Licinius in 183 BC, was more extravagant. It involved three days of funeral games, 120 gladiators, and public distribution of meat (visceratio data)—a practice that reflected the gladiatorial fights at Campanian banquets described by Livy and later deplored by Silius Italicus.

The enthusiastic adoption of munera gladiatoria by Rome's Iberian allies shows how easily, and how early, the culture of the gladiator munus permeated places far from Rome itself. By 174 BC, "small" Roman munera (private or public), provided by an editor of relatively low importance, may have been so commonplace and unremarkable they were not considered worth recording:

Many gladiatorial games were given in that year, some unimportant, one noteworthy beyond the rest—that of Titus Flamininus which he gave to commemorate the death of his father, which lasted four days, and was accompanied by a public distribution of meats, a banquet, and scenic performances. The climax of the show which was big for the time was that in three days seventy four gladiators fought.

In 105 BC, the ruling consuls offered Rome its first taste of state-sponsored "barbarian combat" demonstrated by gladiators from Capua, as part of a training program for the military. It proved immensely popular. Thereafter, the gladiator contests formerly restricted to private munera were often included in the state games (ludi) that accompanied the major religious festivals. Where traditional ludi had been dedicated to a deity, such as Jupiter, the munera could be dedicated to an aristocratic sponsor's divine or heroic ancestor.

=== Peak ===
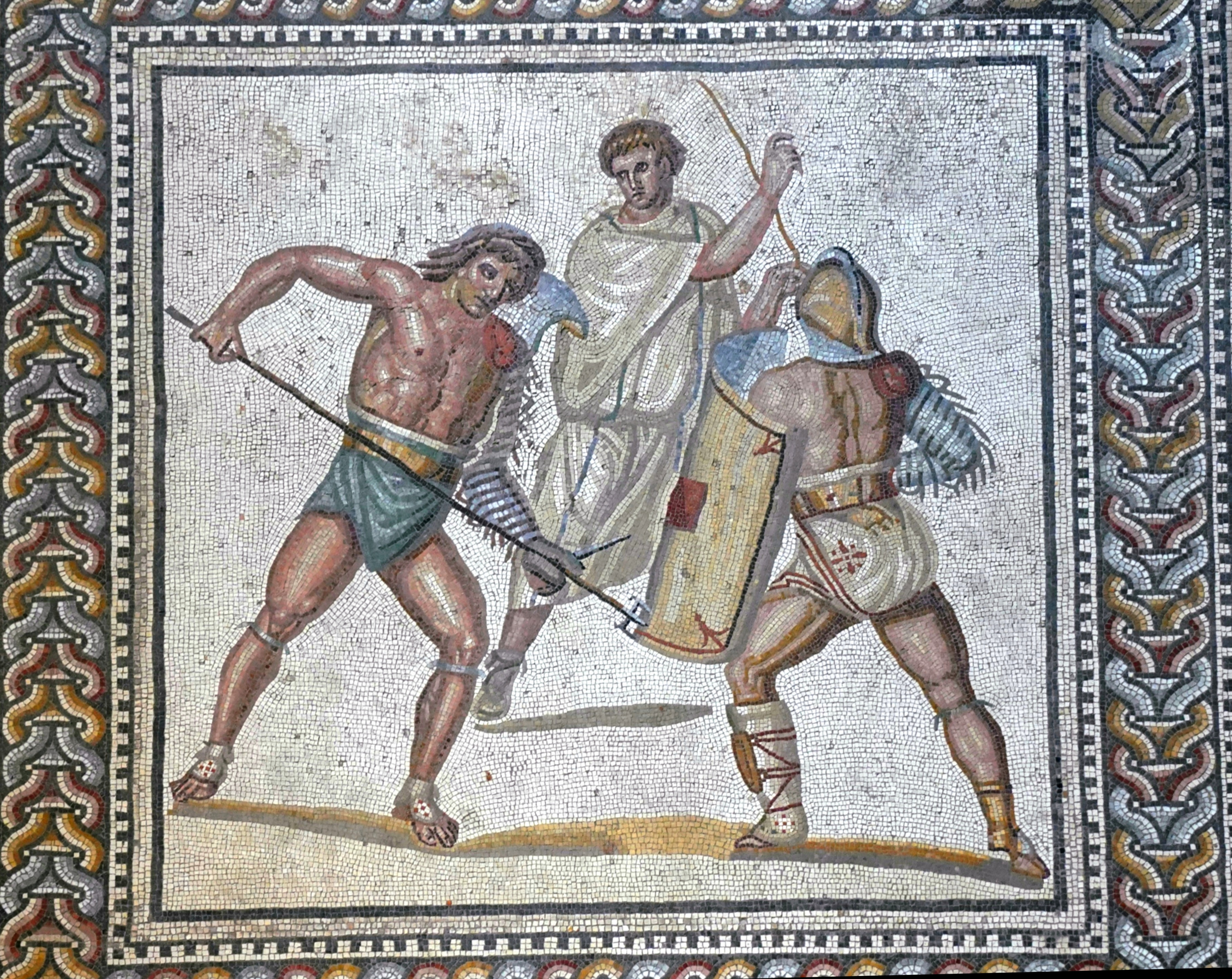
A retiarius stabs at a secutor with his trident in this mosaic from the villa at Nennig, Germany, c. 2nd–3rd century AD.

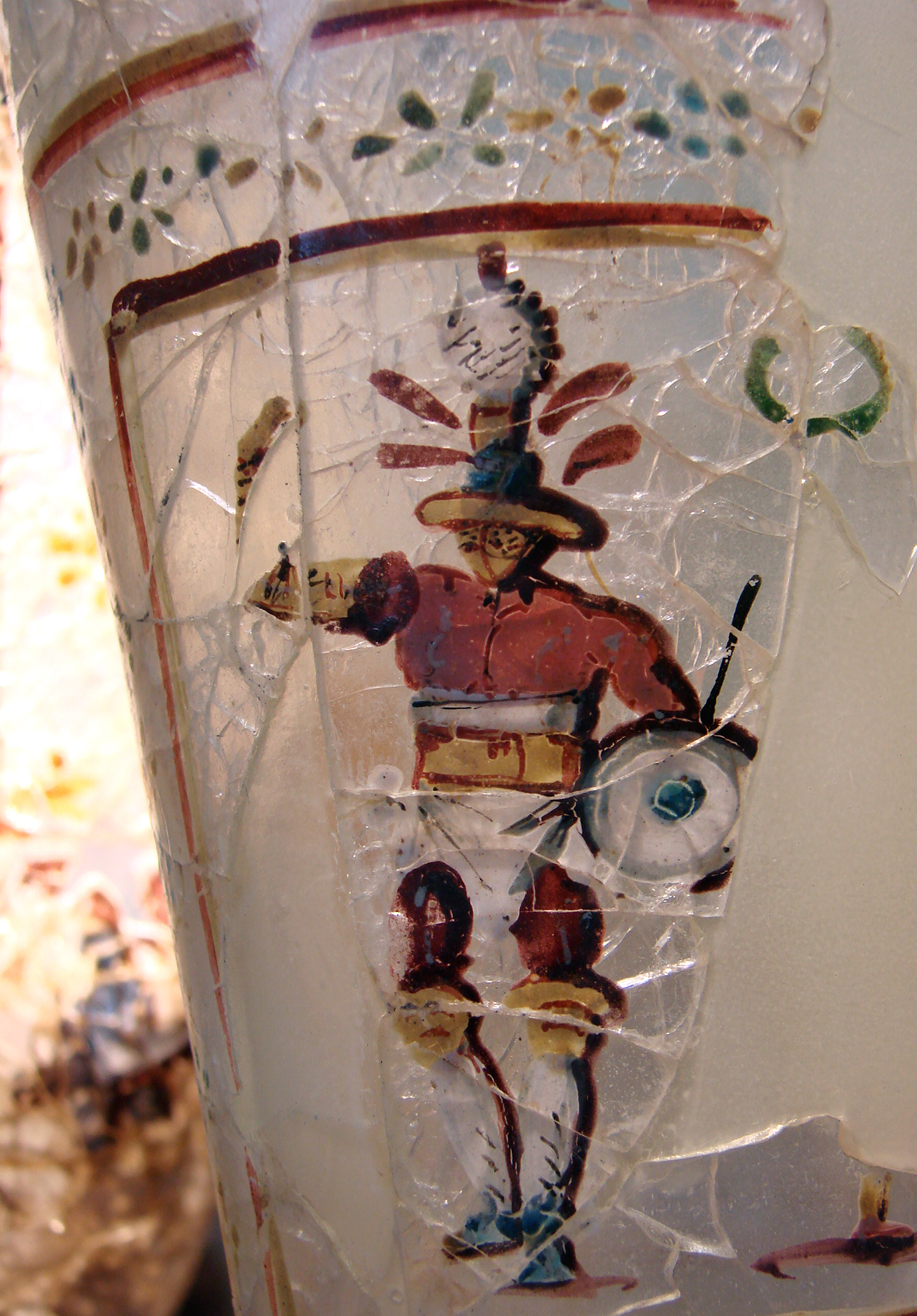
Roman glassware decorated with a gladiator, dated 52–125 AD and found at Begram, Afghanistan, a royal city of the Kushan Empire where, according to Warwick Ball, it was likely on its way to Han dynasty China via the Silk Road along with other glass items.

Gladiatorial games offered their sponsors extravagantly expensive but effective opportunities for self-promotion, and gave their clients and potential voters exciting entertainment at little or no cost to themselves. Gladiators became big business for trainers and owners, for politicians on the make and those who had reached the top and wished to stay there. A politically ambitious privatus (private citizen) might postpone his deceased father's munus to the election season, when a generous show might drum up votes; those in power and those seeking it needed the support of the plebeians and their tribunes, whose votes might be won with the mere promise of an exceptionally good show. Sulla, during his term as praetor, showed his usual acumen in breaking his own sumptuary laws to give the most lavish munus yet seen in Rome, for the funeral of his wife, Metella.

In the closing years of the politically and socially unstable Late Republic, any aristocratic owner of gladiators had political muscle at his disposal. In 65 BC, newly elected curule aedile Julius Caesar held games that he justified as munus to his father, who had been dead for 20 years. Despite an already enormous personal debt, he used 320 gladiator pairs in silvered armour. He had more available in Capua but the senate, mindful of the recent Spartacus revolt and fearful of Caesar's burgeoning private armies and rising popularity, imposed a limit of 320 pairs as the maximum number of gladiators any citizen could keep in Rome. Caesar's showmanship was unprecedented in scale and expense; he had staged a munus as memorial rather than funeral rite, eroding any practical or meaningful distinction between munus and ludi.

Gladiatorial games, usually linked with beast shows, spread throughout the republic and beyond. Anti-corruption laws of 65 and 63 BC attempted but failed to curb the political usefulness of the games to their sponsors. Following Caesar's assassination and the Roman Civil War, Augustus assumed imperial authority over the games, including munera, and formalised their provision as a civic and religious duty. His revision of sumptuary law capped private and public expenditure on munera, claiming to save the Roman elite from the bankruptcies they would otherwise suffer, and restricting gladiator munera to the festivals of Saturnalia and Quinquatria. Henceforth, an imperial praetor's official munus was allowed a maximum of 120 gladiators at a ceiling cost of 25,000 denarii; an imperial ludi might cost no less than 180,000 denarii. Throughout the empire, the greatest and most celebrated games would now be identified with the state-sponsored imperial cult, which furthered public recognition, respect and approval for the emperor's divine numen, his laws, and his agents. Between 108 and 109 AD, Trajan celebrated his Dacian victories using a reported 10,000 gladiators and 11,000 animals over 123 days. The cost of gladiators and munera continued to spiral out of control. Legislation of 177 AD by Marcus Aurelius did little to stop it, and was completely ignored by his son, Commodus.

=== Decline ===
The decline of the gladiatorial munus was a far from straightforward process. The crisis of the 3rd century imposed increasing military demands on the imperial purse, from which the Roman Empire never quite recovered, and lesser magistrates found their provision of various obligatory munera an increasingly unrewarding tax on the doubtful privileges of office. Still, emperors continued to subsidize the games as a matter of undiminished public interest. In the early 3rd century AD, the Christian writer Tertullian condemned the attendance of Christians: the combats, he said, were murder, their witnessing spiritually and morally harmful and the gladiator an instrument of pagan human sacrifice. Carolyn Osiek comments:

The reason, we would suppose, would be primarily the bloodthirsty violence, but his is different: the extent of religious ritual and meaning in them, which constitutes idolatry. Although Tertullian states that these events are forbidden to believers, the fact that he writes a whole treatise to convince Christians that they should not attend (De Spectaculis) shows that apparently not everyone agreed to stay away from them.

In the next century, Augustine of Hippo deplored the youthful fascination of his friend (and later fellow-convert and bishop) Alypius of Thagaste, with the munera spectacle as inimical to a Christian life and salvation. Amphitheatres continued to host the spectacular administration of Imperial justice: in 315 Constantine the Great condemned child-snatchers ad bestias in the arena. Ten years later, he forbade criminals being forced to fight to the death as gladiators:

Bloody spectacles do not please us in civil ease and domestic quiet. For that reason we forbid those people to be gladiators who by reason of some criminal act were accustomed to deserve this condition and sentence. You shall rather sentence them to serve in the mines so that they may acknowledge the penalties of their crimes with blood.

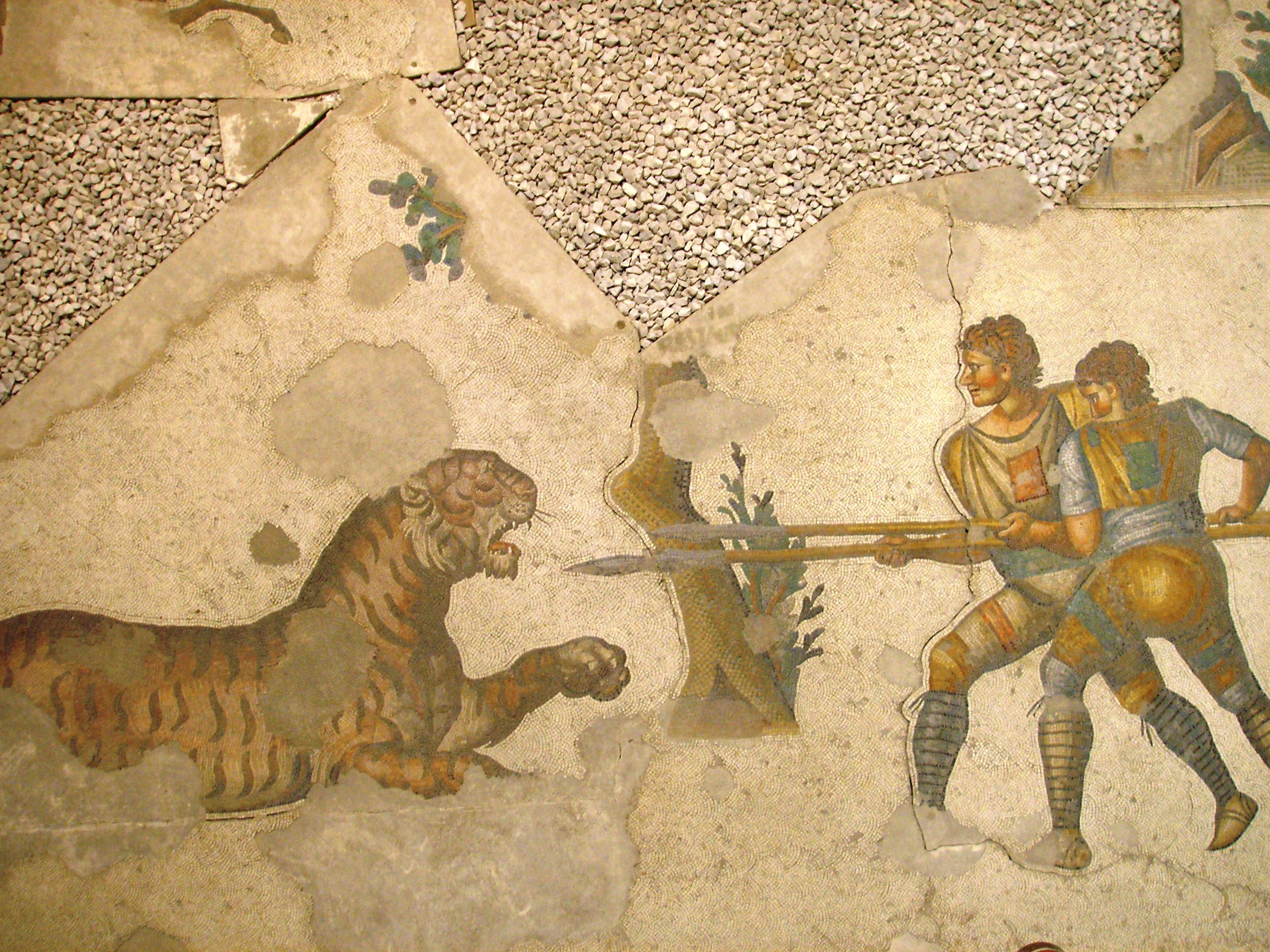
A 5th-century mosaic in the Great Palace of Constantinople depicts two venatores fighting a tiger

This has been interpreted as a ban on gladiatorial combat. Yet, in the last year of his life, Constantine wrote a letter to the citizens of Hispellum, granting its people the right to celebrate his rule with gladiatorial games.

In 365, Valentinian I (r. 364–375) threatened to fine a judge who sentenced Christians to the arena and in 384 attempted, like most of his predecessors, to limit the expenses of gladiatora munera.

In 393, Theodosius I (r. 379–395) adopted Nicene Christianity as the state religion of the Roman Empire and banned pagan festivals. The ludi continued, very gradually shorn of their stubbornly pagan elements. Honorius (r. 395–423) legally ended gladiator games in 399, and again in 404, at least in the Western Roman Empire. According to Theodoret, the ban was in consequence of Saint Telemachus' martyrdom by spectators at a gladiator munus. Valentinian III (r. 425–455) repeated the ban in 438, perhaps effectively, though venationes continued beyond 536. By this time, interest in gladiator contests had waned throughout the Roman world. In the Byzantine Empire, theatrical shows and chariot races continued to attract the crowds, and drew a generous imperial subsidy.

== Organisation ==
The earliest munera took place at or near the tomb of the deceased and these were organised by their munerator (who made the offering). Later games were held by an editor, either identical with the munerator or an official employed by him. As time passed, these titles and meanings may have merged. In the republican era, private citizens could own and train gladiators, or lease them from a lanista (owner of a gladiator training school). From the principate onwards, private citizens could hold munera and own gladiators only with imperial permission, and the role of editor was increasingly tied to state officialdom. Legislation by Claudius required that quaestors, the lowest rank of Roman magistrate, personally subsidise two-thirds of the costs of games for their small-town communities—in effect, both an advertisement of their personal generosity and a part-purchase of their office. Bigger games were put on by senior magistrates, who could better afford them. The largest and most lavish of all were paid for by the emperor himself.

== The gladiators ==
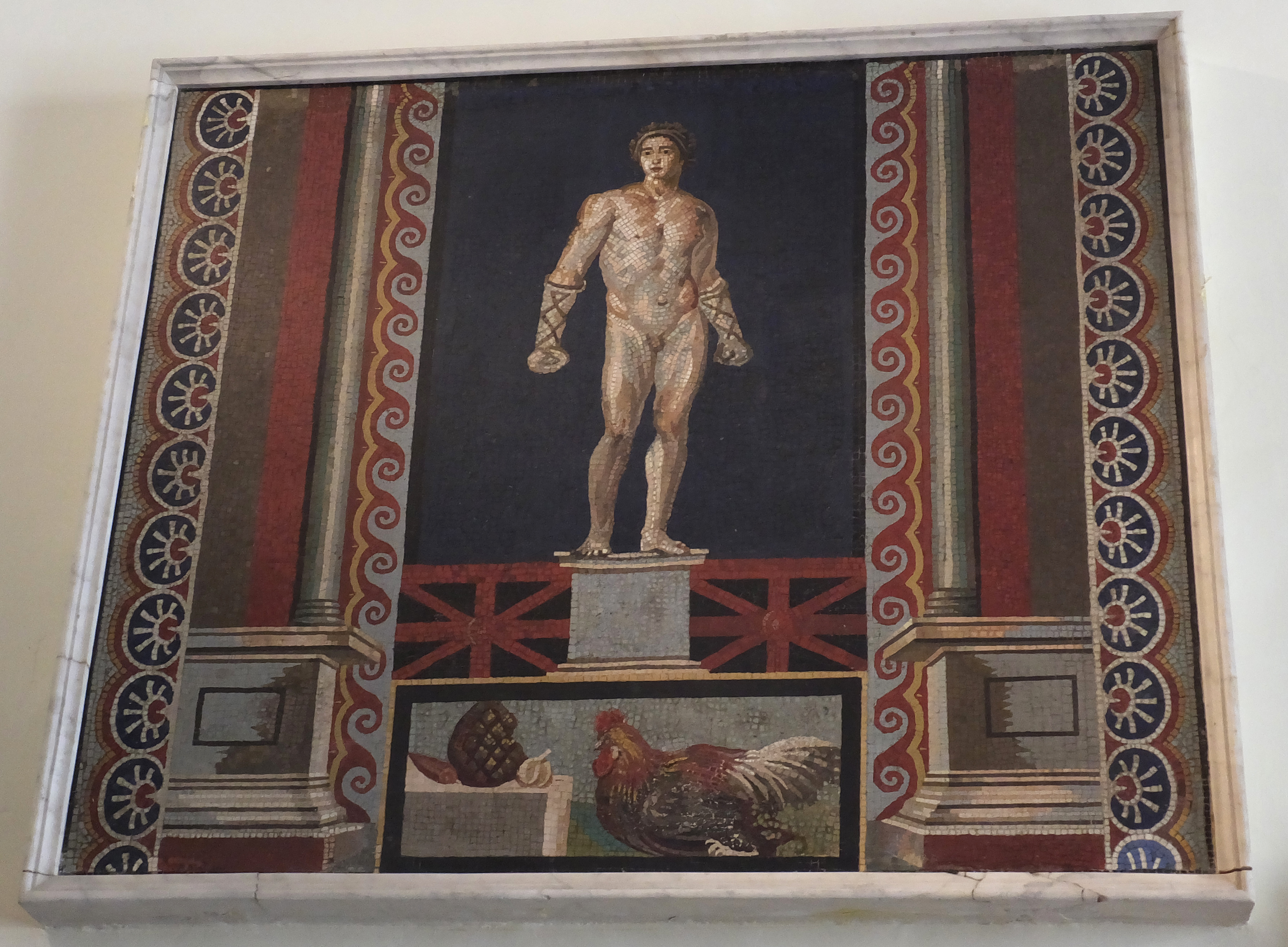
A Cestus boxer and a rooster in a Roman mosaic at the National Archaeological Museum, Naples, 1st century AD

The earliest types of gladiator were named after Rome's enemies of that time: the Samnite, Thracian and Gaul. The Samnite, heavily armed, elegantly helmed and probably the most popular type, was renamed secutor and the Gaul renamed murmillo, once these former enemies had been conquered then absorbed into Rome's Empire. In the mid-republican munus, each type seems to have fought against a similar or identical type. In the later Republic and early Empire, various "fantasy" types were introduced, and were set against dissimilar but complementary types. For example, the bareheaded, nimble retiarius ("net-man"), armoured only at the left arm and shoulder, pitted his net, trident and dagger against the more heavily armoured, helmeted Secutor. Most depictions of gladiators show the most common and popular types. Passing literary references to others has allowed their tentative reconstruction. Other novelties introduced around this time included gladiators who fought from chariots or carts, or from horseback. At an unknown date, cestus fighters were introduced to Roman arenas, probably from Greece, armed with potentially lethal boxing gloves.

The trade in gladiators was empire-wide, and subject to official supervision. Rome's military success produced a supply of soldier-prisoners who were redistributed for use in State mines or amphitheatres and for sale on the open market. For example, in the aftermath of the Jewish Revolt, the gladiator schools received an influx of Jews—those rejected for training were sent straight to the arenas as noxii (lit. "hurtful ones"). The best—the most robust—were sent to Rome. In Rome's military ethos, enemy soldiers who had surrendered or allowed their own capture and enslavement had been granted an unmerited gift of life. Their training as gladiators gave them the opportunity to redeem their honour in the munus.

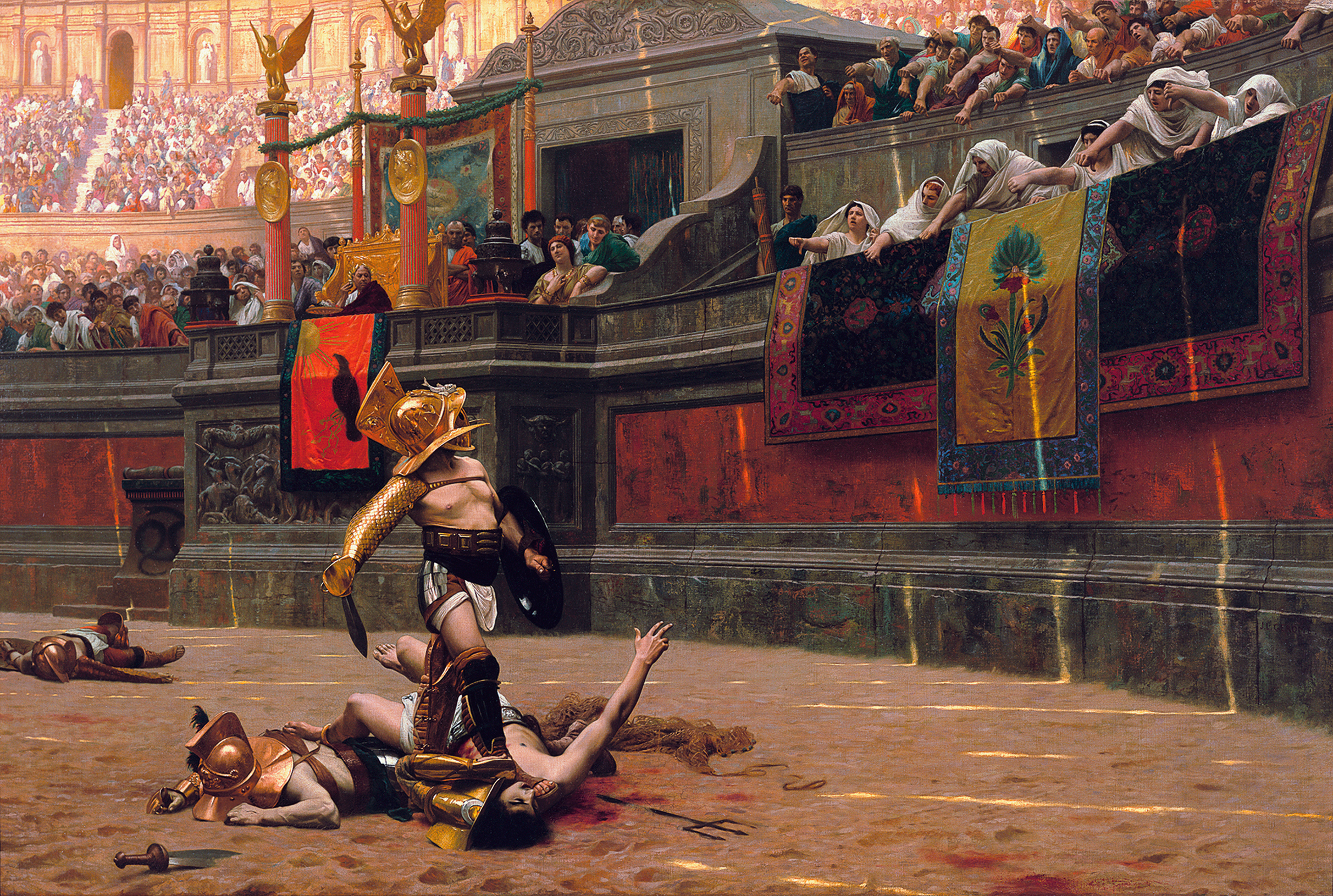
Pollice Verso ("With a Turned Thumb"), an 1872 painting by Jean-Léon Gérôme

Two other sources of gladiators, found increasingly during the Principate and the relatively low military activity of the Pax Romana, were slaves condemned to the arena (damnati), to gladiator schools or games (ad ludum gladiatorium) as punishment for crimes, and the paid volunteers (auctorati) who by the late Republic may have comprised approximately half—and possibly the most capable half—of all gladiators. The use of volunteers had a precedent in the Iberian munus of Scipio Africanus; but none of those had been paid.

For the poor, and for non-citizens, enrollment in a gladiator school offered a trade, regular food, housing of sorts and a fighting chance of fame and fortune. Mark Antony chose a troupe of gladiators to be his personal bodyguard. Gladiators customarily kept their prize money and any gifts they received, and these could be substantial. Tiberius offered several retired gladiators 100,000 sesterces each to return to the arena. Nero gave the gladiator Spiculus property and residence "equal to those of men who had celebrated triumphs."

=== Women ===
From the 60s AD female gladiators appear as rare and "exotic markers of exceptionally lavish spectacle". In 66 AD, Nero had Ethiopian women, men and children fight at a munus to impress the King Tiridates I of Armenia. Romans seem to have found the idea of a female gladiator novel and entertaining, or downright absurd; Juvenal titillates his readers with a woman named "Mevia", hunting boars in the arena "with spear in hand and breasts exposed", and Petronius mocks the pretensions of a rich, low-class citizen, whose munus includes a woman fighting from a cart or chariot. A munus of 89 AD, during Domitian's reign, featured a battle between female gladiators, described as "Amazons". In Halicarnassus, a 2nd-century AD relief depicts two female combatants named "Amazon" and "Achillia"; their match ended in a draw. In the same century, an epigraph praises one of Ostia's local elite as the first to "arm women" in the history of its games. Female gladiators probably submitted to the same regulations and training as their male counterparts. Roman morality required that all gladiators be of the lowest social classes, and emperors who failed to respect this distinction earned the scorn of posterity. Cassius Dio takes pains to point out that when the much admired emperor Titus used female gladiators, they were of acceptably low class.

Some regarded female gladiators of any type or class as a symptom of corrupted Roman appetites, morals and womanhood. Before he became emperor, Septimius Severus may have attended the Antiochene Olympic Games, which had been revived by the emperor Commodus and included traditional Greek female athletics. Septimius' attempt to give Rome a similarly dignified display of female athletics was met by the crowd with ribald chants and cat-calls. Probably as a result, he banned the use of female gladiators in 200 AD.

=== Emperors ===
Caligula, Titus, Hadrian, Lucius Verus, Caracalla, Geta and Didius Julianus were all said to have performed in the arena, either in public or private, but risks to themselves were minimal. Claudius, characterised by his historians as morbidly cruel and boorish, fought a whale trapped in the harbor in front of a group of spectators. Commentators invariably disapproved of such performances.

Commodus was a fanatical participant at the ludi, and compelled Rome's elite to attend his performances as gladiator, bestiarius or venator. Most of his performances as a gladiator were bloodless affairs, fought with wooden swords; he invariably won. He was said to have restyled Nero's colossal statue in his own image as "Hercules Reborn", dedicated to himself as "Champion of secutores; only left-handed fighter to conquer twelve times one thousand men." He was said to have killed 100 lions in one day, almost certainly from an elevated platform surrounding the arena perimeter, which allowed him to safely demonstrate his marksmanship. On another occasion, he decapitated a running ostrich with a specially designed dart, carried the bloodied head and his sword over to the Senatorial seats and gesticulated as though they were next. As reward for these services, he drew a gigantic stipend from the public purse.

== Games ==
=== Preparations ===
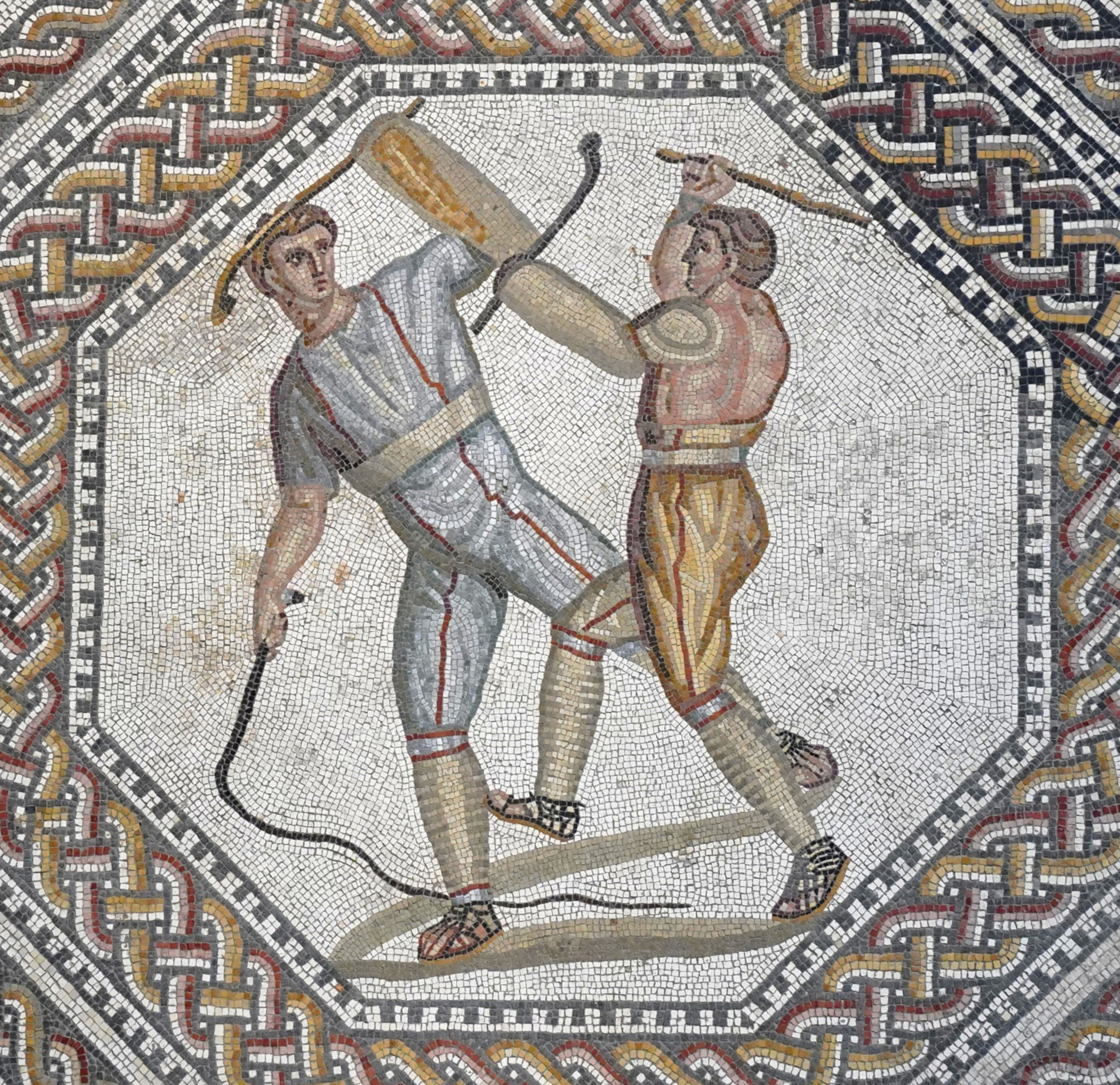
A duel, using whip, cudgel and shields, mosaic from a Roman villa at Nennig, Germany

Gladiator games were advertised well beforehand, on billboards that gave the reason for the game, its editor, venue, date and the number of paired gladiators (ordinarii) to be used. Other highlighted features could include details of venationes, executions, music and any luxuries to be provided for the spectators, such as an awning against the sun, water sprinklers, food, drink, sweets and occasionally "door prizes". For enthusiasts and gamblers, a more detailed program (libellus) was distributed on the day of the munus, showing the names, types and match records of gladiator pairs, and their order of appearance. Left-handed gladiators were advertised as a rarity; they were trained to fight right-handers, which gave them an advantage over most opponents and produced an interestingly unorthodox combination.

The night before the munus, the gladiators were given a banquet and opportunity to order their personal and private affairs; Futrell notes its similarity to a ritualistic or sacramental "last meal". These were probably both family and public events which included even the noxii, sentenced to die in the arena the following day; and the damnati, who would have at least a slender chance of survival. The event may also have been used to drum up more publicity for the imminent game.

=== The ludi and munus ===
Official munera of the early Imperial era seem to have followed a standard form (munus legitimum). A procession (pompa) entered the arena, led by lictors who bore the fasces that signified the magistrate-editor's power over life and death. They were followed by a small band of trumpeters (tubicines) playing a fanfare. Images of the gods were carried in to "witness" the proceedings, followed by a scribe to record the outcome, and a man carrying the palm branch used to honour victors. The magistrate editor entered among a retinue who carried the arms and armour to be used; the gladiators presumably came in last.

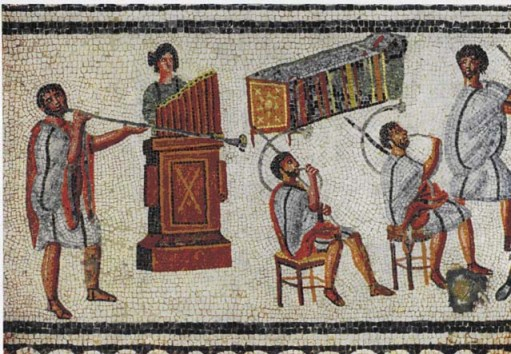
Musicians with trumpet (tuba), water organ (hydraulis), and horns (cornua), from the Zliten mosaic

The entertainments often began with venationes (beast hunts) and bestiarii (beast fighters). Next came the ludi meridiani, which were of variable content but usually involved executions of noxii, some of whom were condemned to be subjects of fatal re-enactments, based on Greek or Roman myths. Gladiators may have been involved in these as executioners, though most of the crowd, and the gladiators themselves, preferred the "dignity" of an even contest. There were also comedy fights; some may have been lethal. A crude Pompeian graffito suggests a burlesque of musicians, dressed as animals named Ursus tibicen (flute-playing bear) and Pullus cornicen (horn-blowing chicken), perhaps as accompaniment to clowning by paegniarii during a "mock" contest of the ludi meridiani.

=== Armatures ===
The gladiators may have held informal warm-up matches, using blunted or dummy weapons—some munera, however, may have used blunted weapons throughout. The editor, his representative or an honoured guest would check the weapons (probatio armorum) for the scheduled matches. These were the highlight of the day, and were as inventive, varied and novel as the editor could afford. Armatures could be very costly—some were flamboyantly decorated with exotic feathers, jewels and precious metals. Increasingly the munus was the editor's gift to spectators who had come to expect the best as their due.

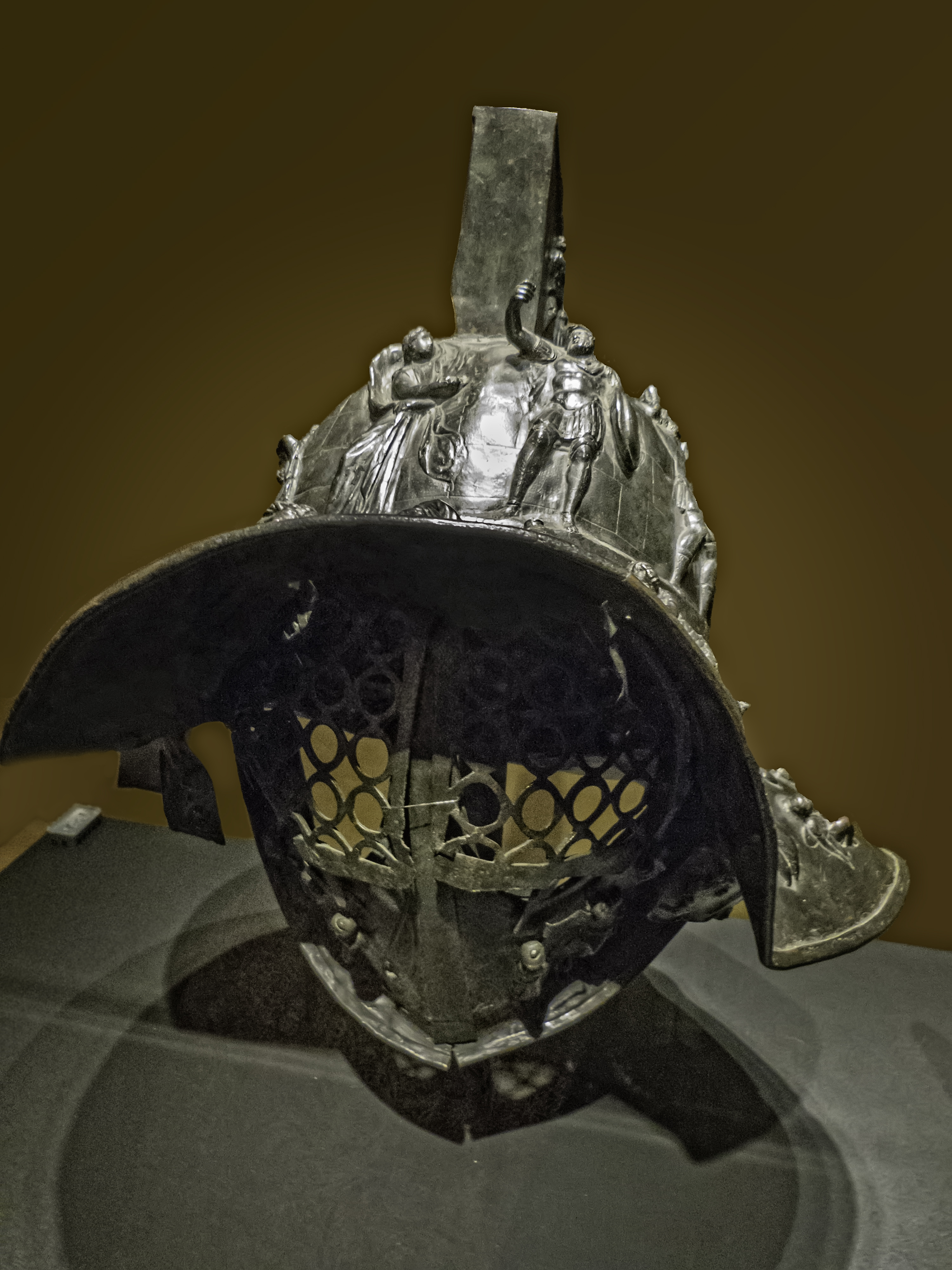
Murmillo gladiator helmet with relief depicting scenes from the Trojan War; from Herculaneum

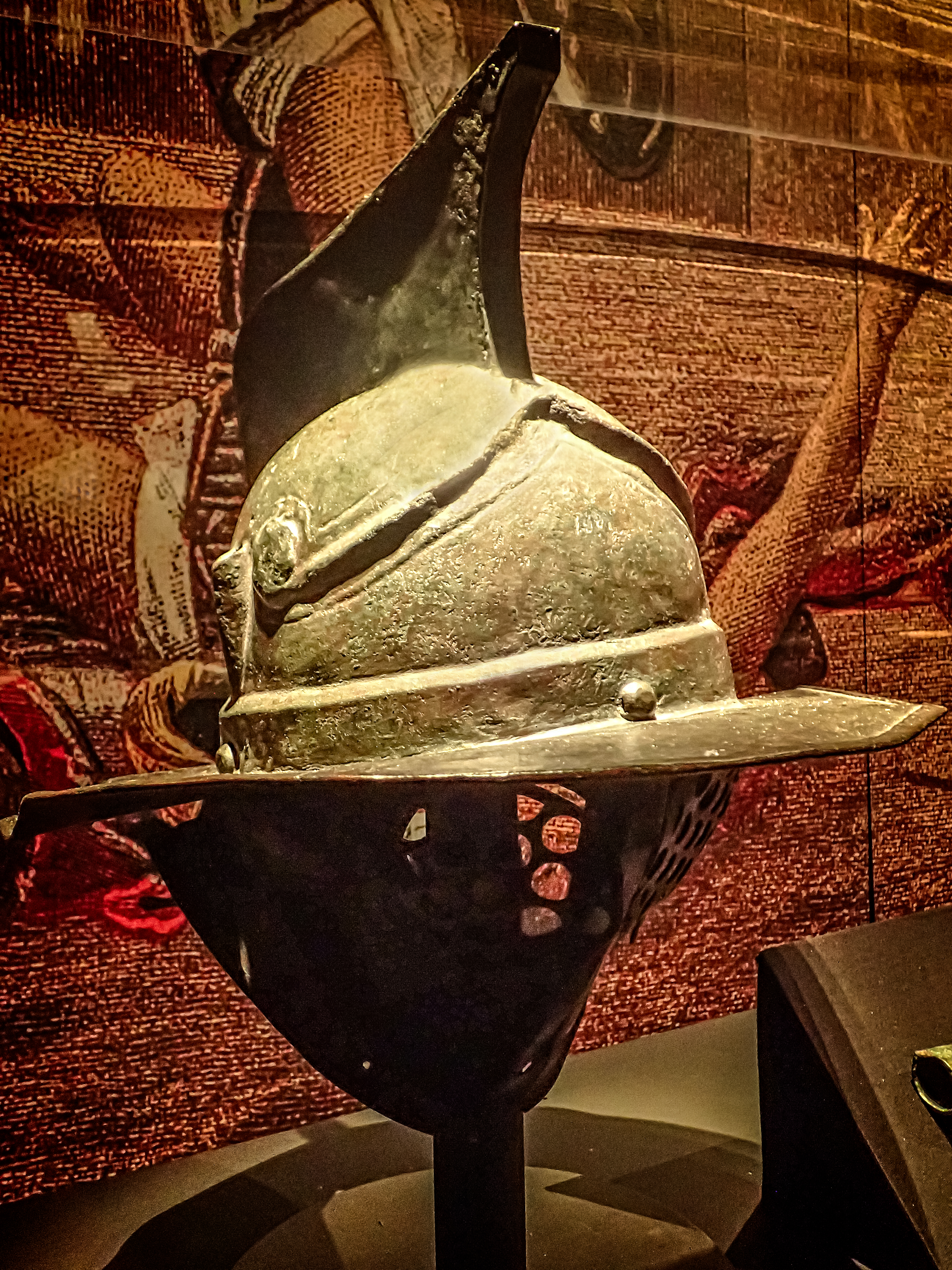
Helmet found in the gladiator barracks in Pompeii

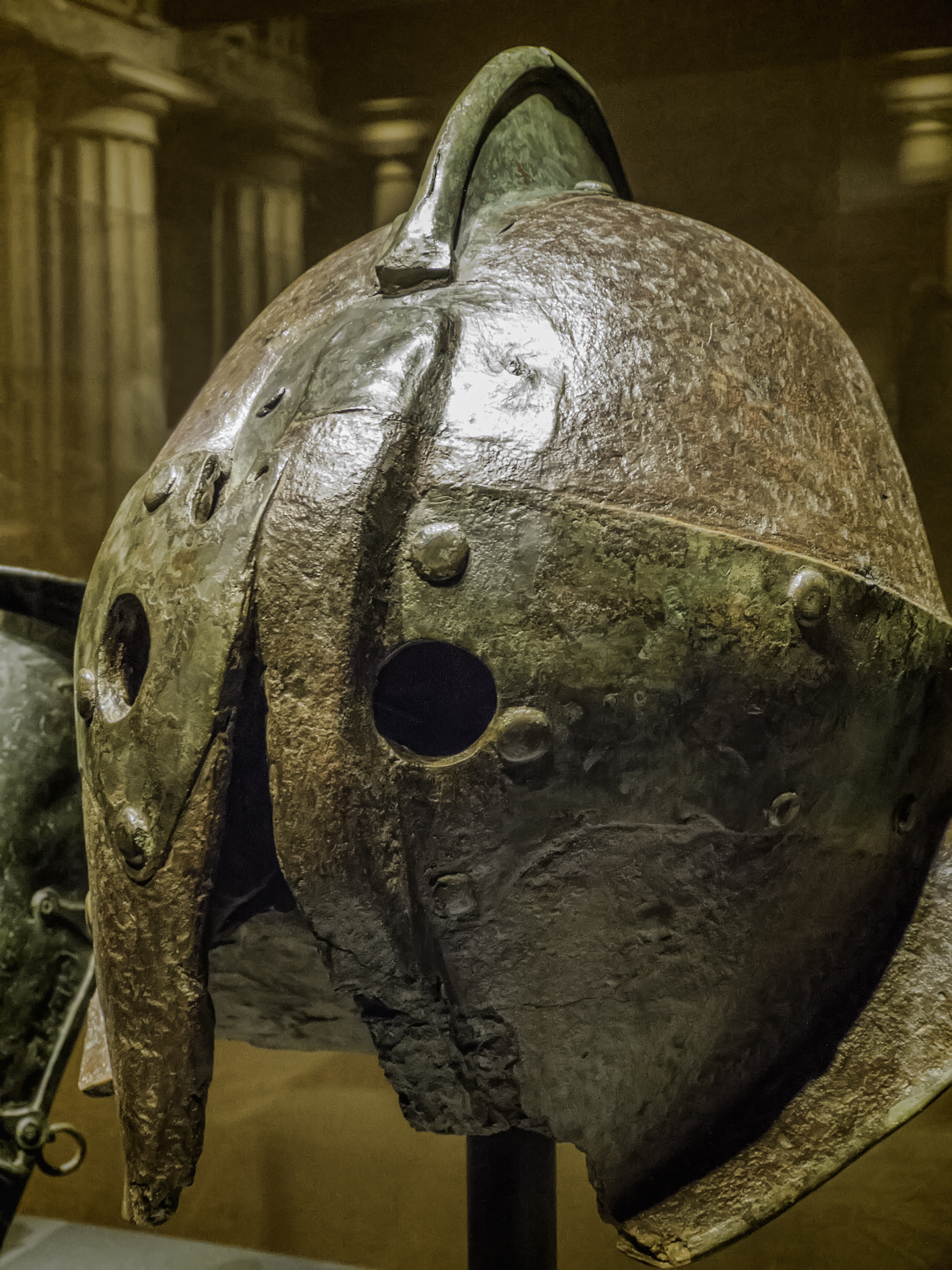
Iron gladiator helmet from Herculaneum

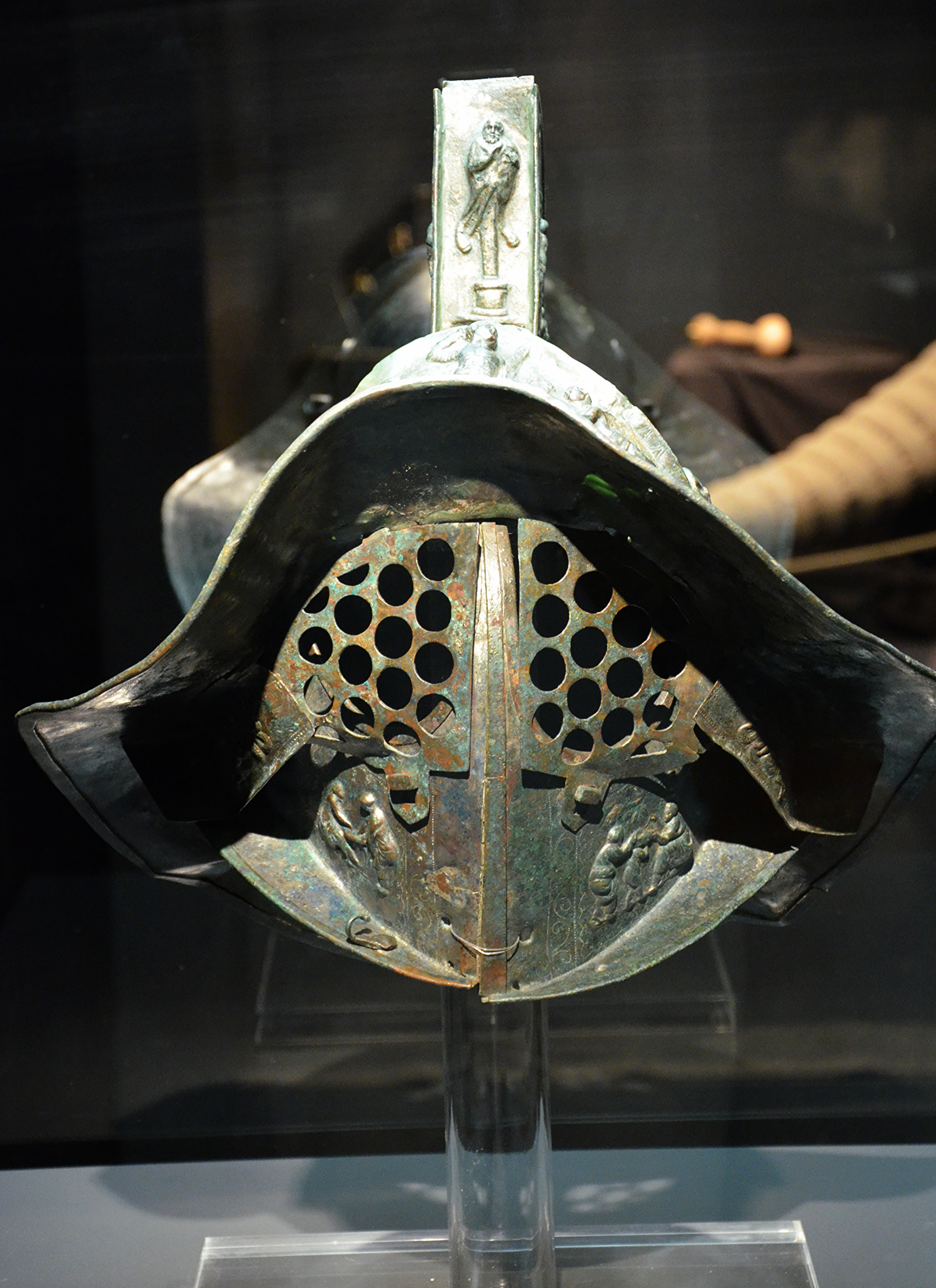
Gladiator helmet found in Pompeii, with scenes from Greek Mythology

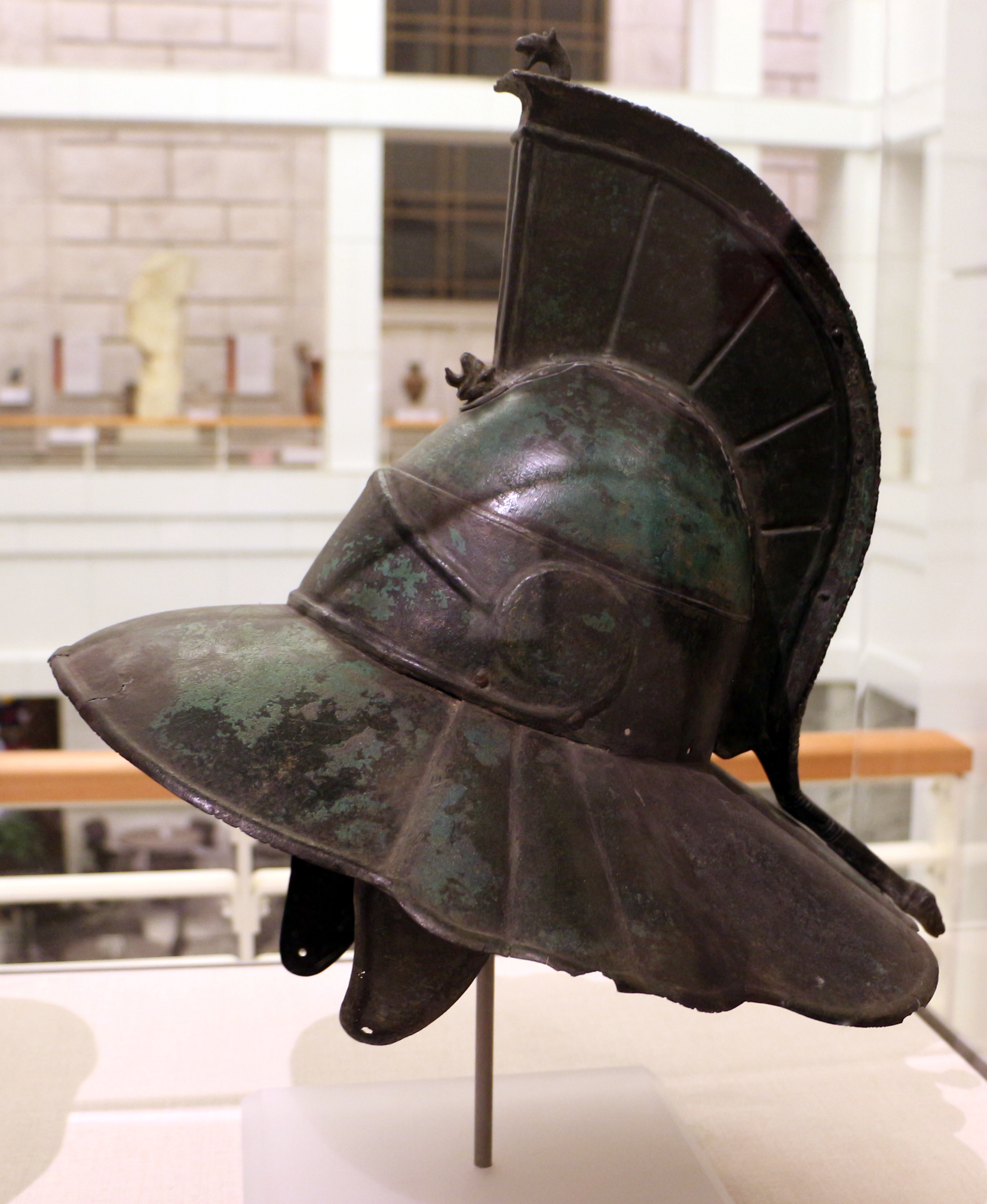
Helmet from 1st–3rd century

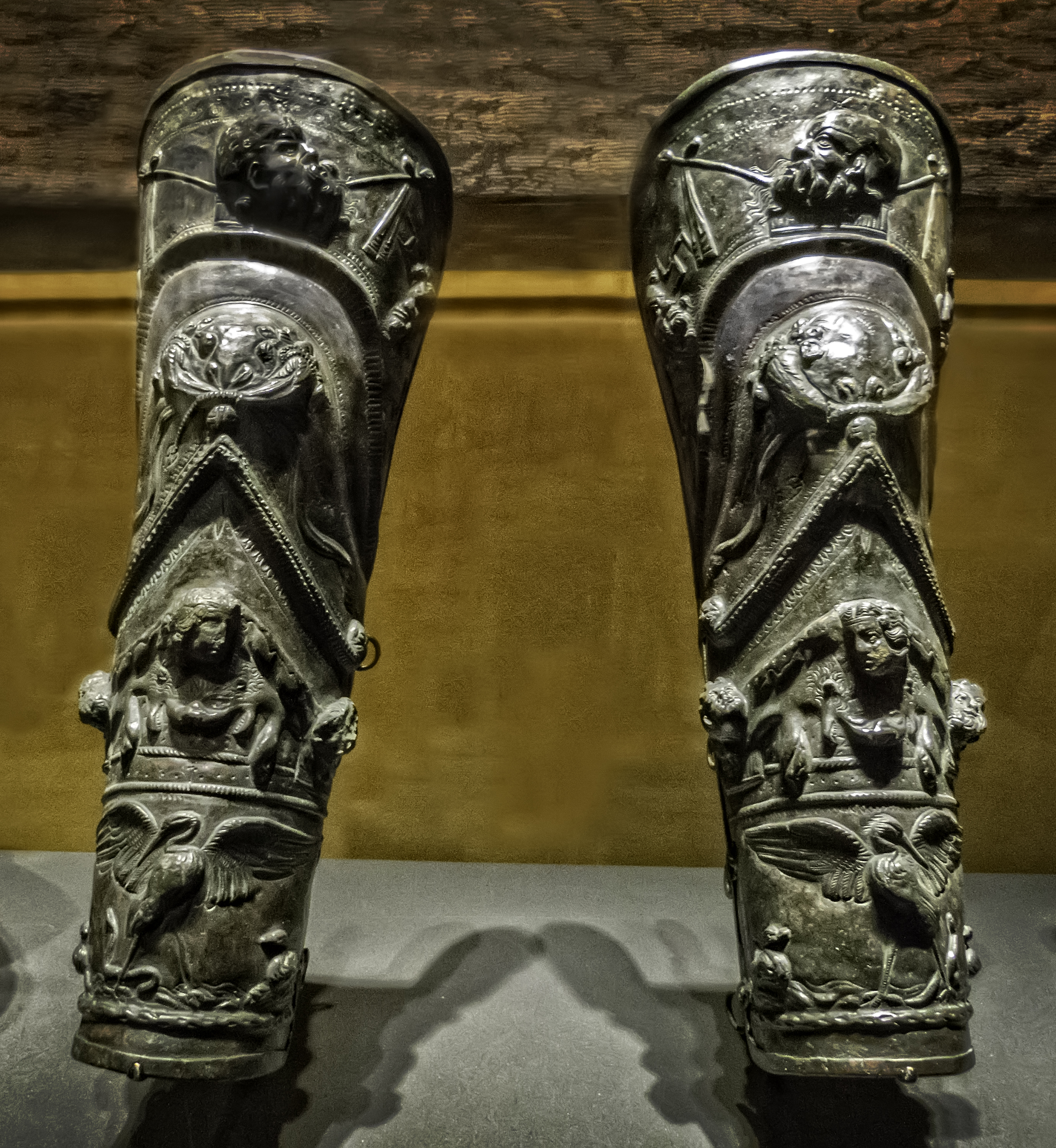
Ornate gladiator shin guards from Pompeii

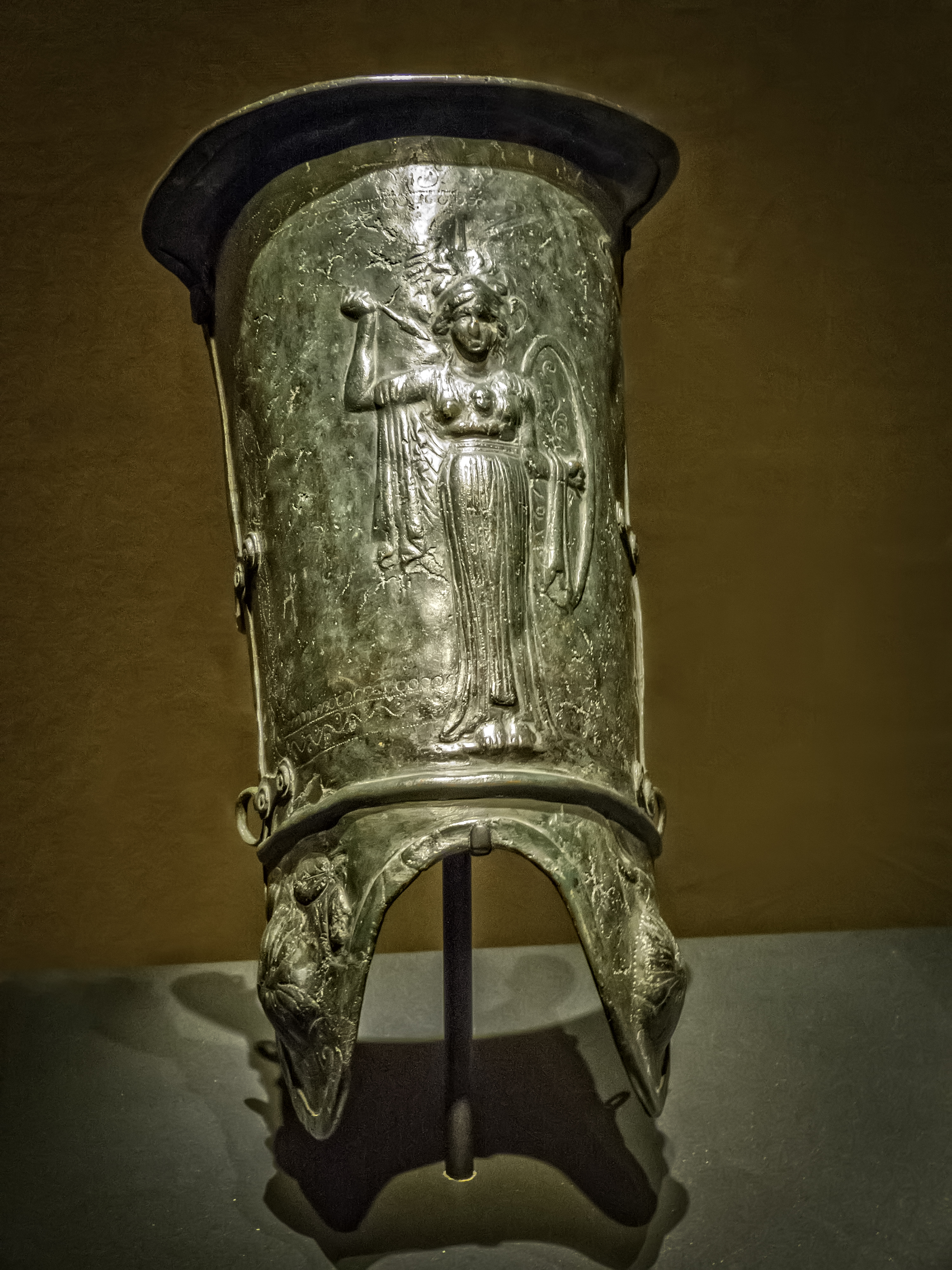
Shin guard depicting the goddess Athena

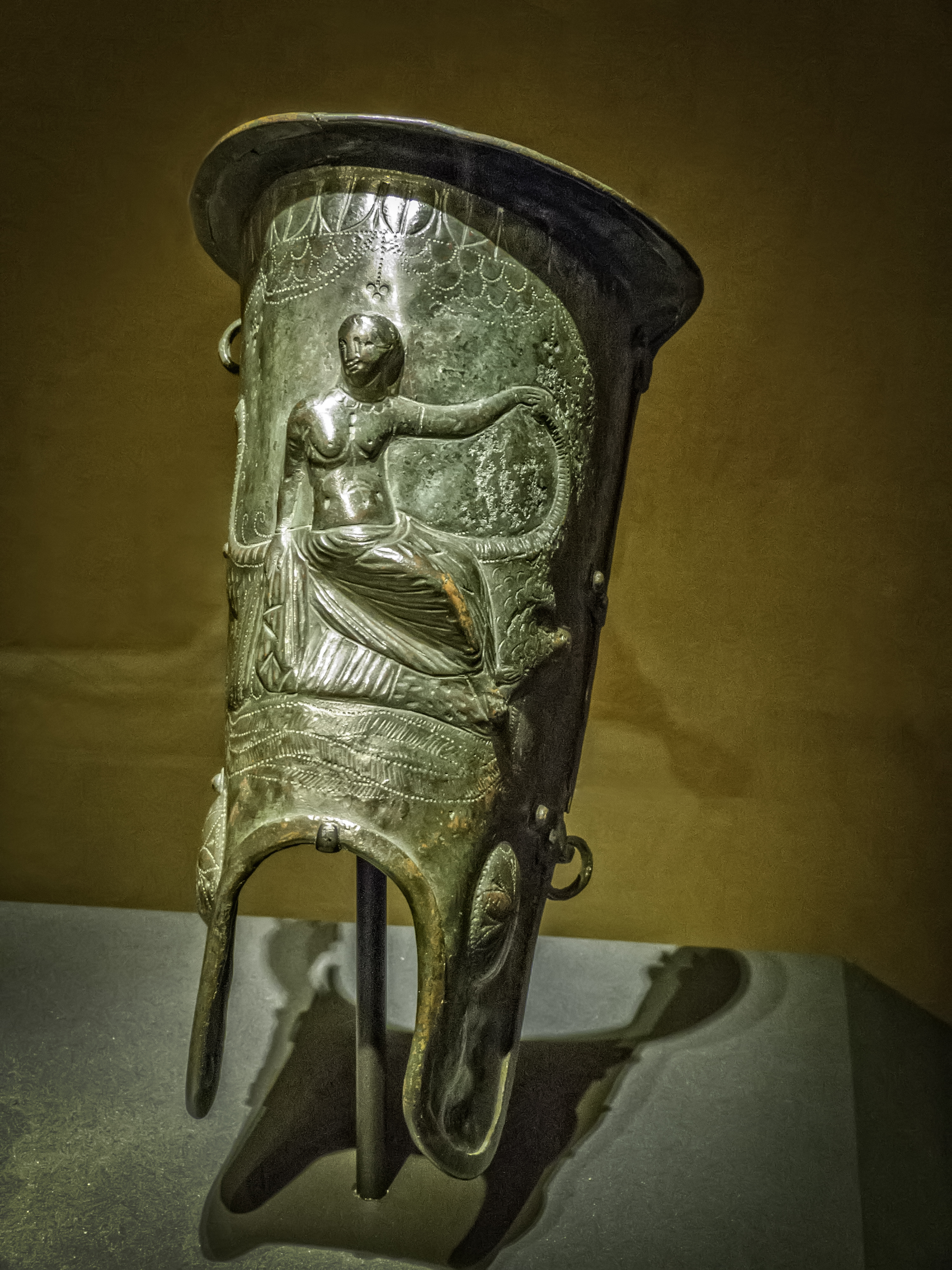
Shin guard depicting Venus Euploia (Venus of the "fair voyage") on a ship shaped like a dolphin

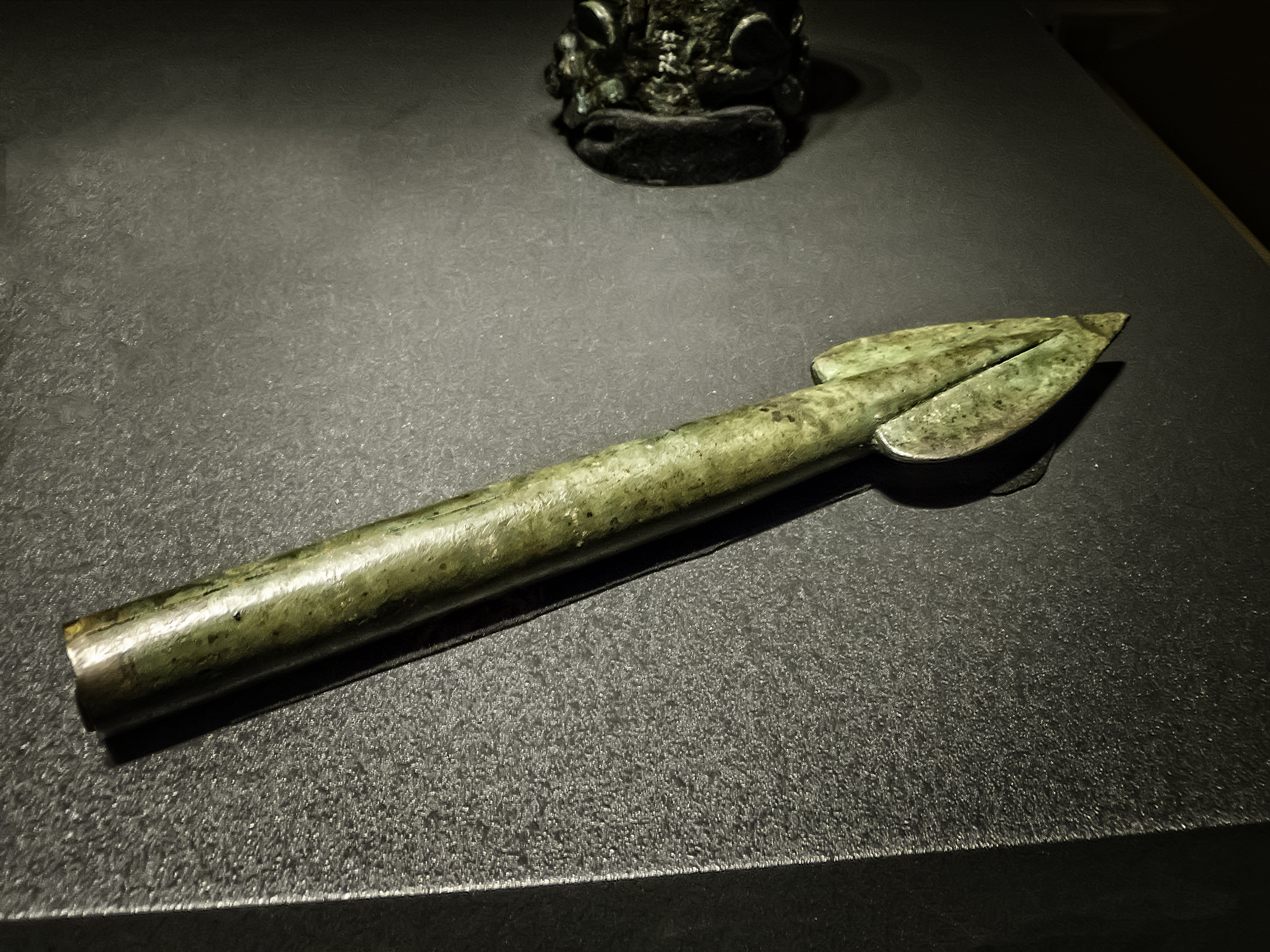
Heart-shaped spear head found in the gladiator barracks in Pompeii

=== Combat ===
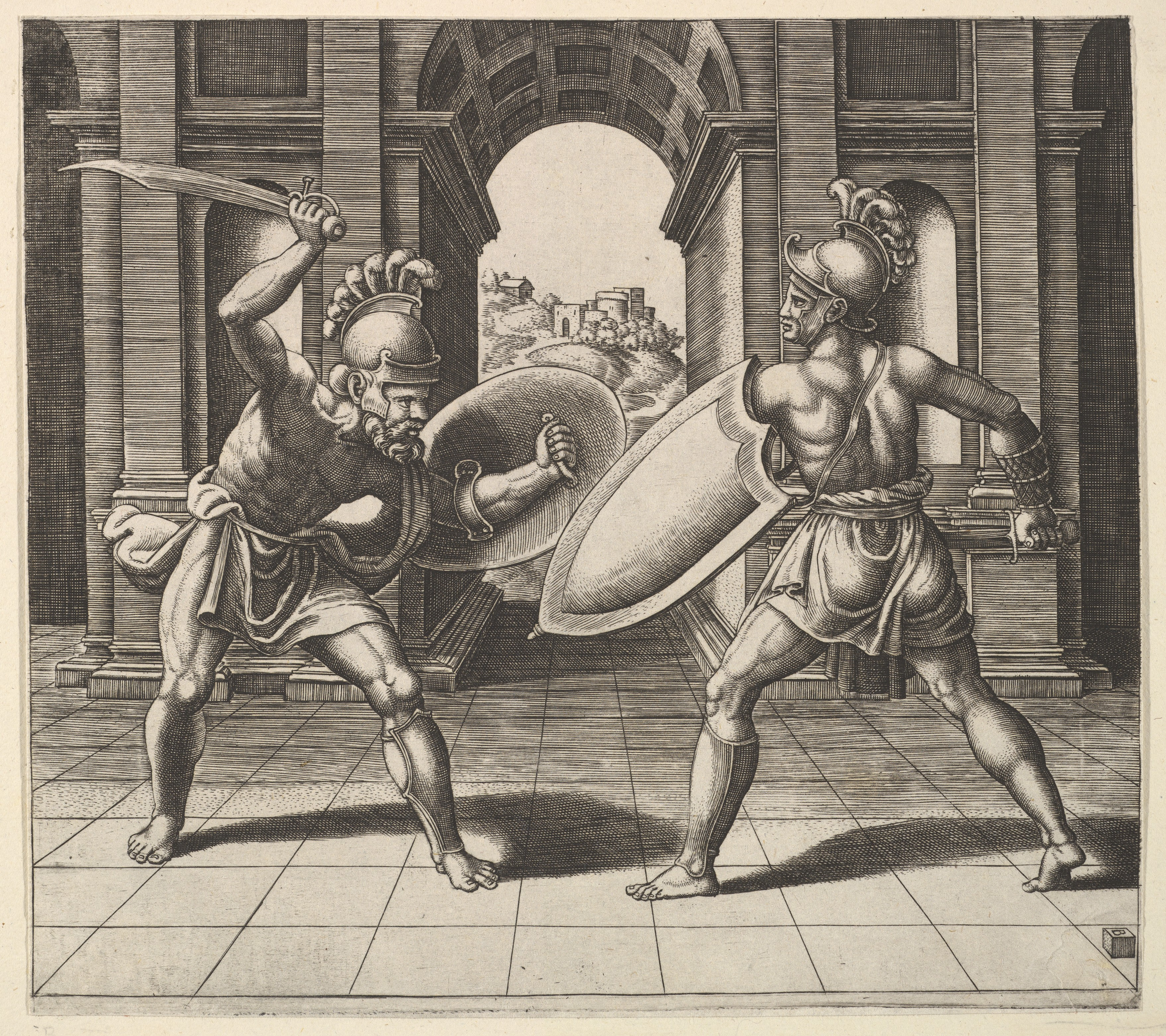
Two gladiators fighting in front of an arch, engraving by Master of the Die, after Giulio Romano, ca. 1560.

Lightly armed and armoured fighters, such as the retiarius, would tire less rapidly than their heavily armed opponents; most bouts would have lasted 10 to 15 minutes, or 20 minutes at most. In late Republican munera, between 10 and 13 matches could have been fought on one day; this assumes one match at a time in the course of an afternoon.

Spectators preferred to watch highly skilled, well matched ordinarii with complementary fighting styles; these were the most costly to train and to hire. A general melee of several, lower-skilled gladiators was far less costly, but also less popular. Even among the ordinarii, match winners might have to fight a new, well-rested opponent, either a tertiarius ("third choice gladiator") by prearrangement; or a "substitute" gladiator (suppositicius) who fought at the whim of the editor as an unadvertised, unexpected "extra". This yielded two combats for the cost of three gladiators, rather than four; such contests were prolonged, and in some cases, more bloody. Most were probably of poor quality, but the emperor Caracalla chose to test a notably skilled and successful fighter named Bato against first one supposicitius, whom he beat, and then another, who killed him. At the opposite level of the profession, a gladiator reluctant to confront his opponent might be whipped, or goaded with hot irons, until he engaged through sheer desperation.

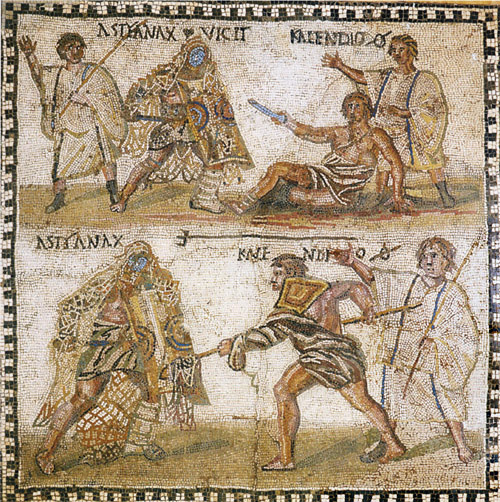
Mosaic at the National Archaeological Museum in Madrid showing a retiarius named Kalendio (shown surrendering in the upper section) fighting a secutor named Astyanax. The Ø sign by Kalendio's name implies he was killed after surrendering.

Combats between experienced, well trained gladiators demonstrated a considerable degree of stagecraft. Among the cognoscenti, bravado and skill in combat were esteemed over mere hacking and bloodshed; some gladiators made their careers and reputation from bloodless victories. Suetonius describes an exceptional munus by Nero, in which no-one was killed, "not even noxii (enemies of the state)."

Trained gladiators were expected to observe professional rules of combat. Most matches employed a senior referee (summa rudis) and an assistant, shown in mosaics with long staffs (rudes) to caution or separate opponents at some crucial point in the match. Referees were usually retired gladiators whose decisions, judgement and discretion were, for the most part, respected; they could stop bouts entirely, or pause them to allow the combatants rest, refreshment and a rub-down.

Ludi and munera were accompanied by music, played as interludes, or building to a "frenzied crescendo" during combats, perhaps to heighten the suspense during a gladiator's appeal; blows may have been accompanied by trumpet-blasts. The Zliten mosaic in Libya (circa 80–100 AD) shows musicians playing an accompaniment to provincial games (with gladiators, bestiarii, or venatores and prisoners attacked by beasts). Their instruments are a long straight trumpet (tubicen), a large curved horn (Cornu) and a water organ (hydraulis). Similar representations (musicians, gladiators and bestiari) are found on a tomb relief in Pompeii.

=== Victory and defeat ===
A match was won by the gladiator who overcame his opponent, or killed him outright. Victors received the palm branch and an award from the editor. An outstanding fighter might receive a laurel crown and money from an appreciative crowd but for anyone originally condemned ad ludum the greatest reward was manumission (emancipation), symbolised by the gift of a wooden training sword or staff (rudis) from the editor. Martial describes a match between Priscus and Verus, who fought so evenly and bravely for so long that when both acknowledged defeat at the same instant, Titus awarded victory and a rudis to each.

A gladiator could acknowledge defeat by raising a finger (ad digitum), in appeal to the referee to stop the combat and refer to the editor, whose decision would usually rest on the crowd's response. In the earliest munera, death was considered a righteous penalty for defeat; later, those who fought well might be granted remission at the whim of the crowd or the editor. During the Imperial era, matches advertised as sine missione (usually understood to mean "without reprieve" for the defeated) suggest that missio (the sparing of a defeated gladiator's life) had become common practice. The contract between editor and his lanista could include compensation for unexpected deaths; this could be "some fifty times higher than the lease price" of the gladiator.

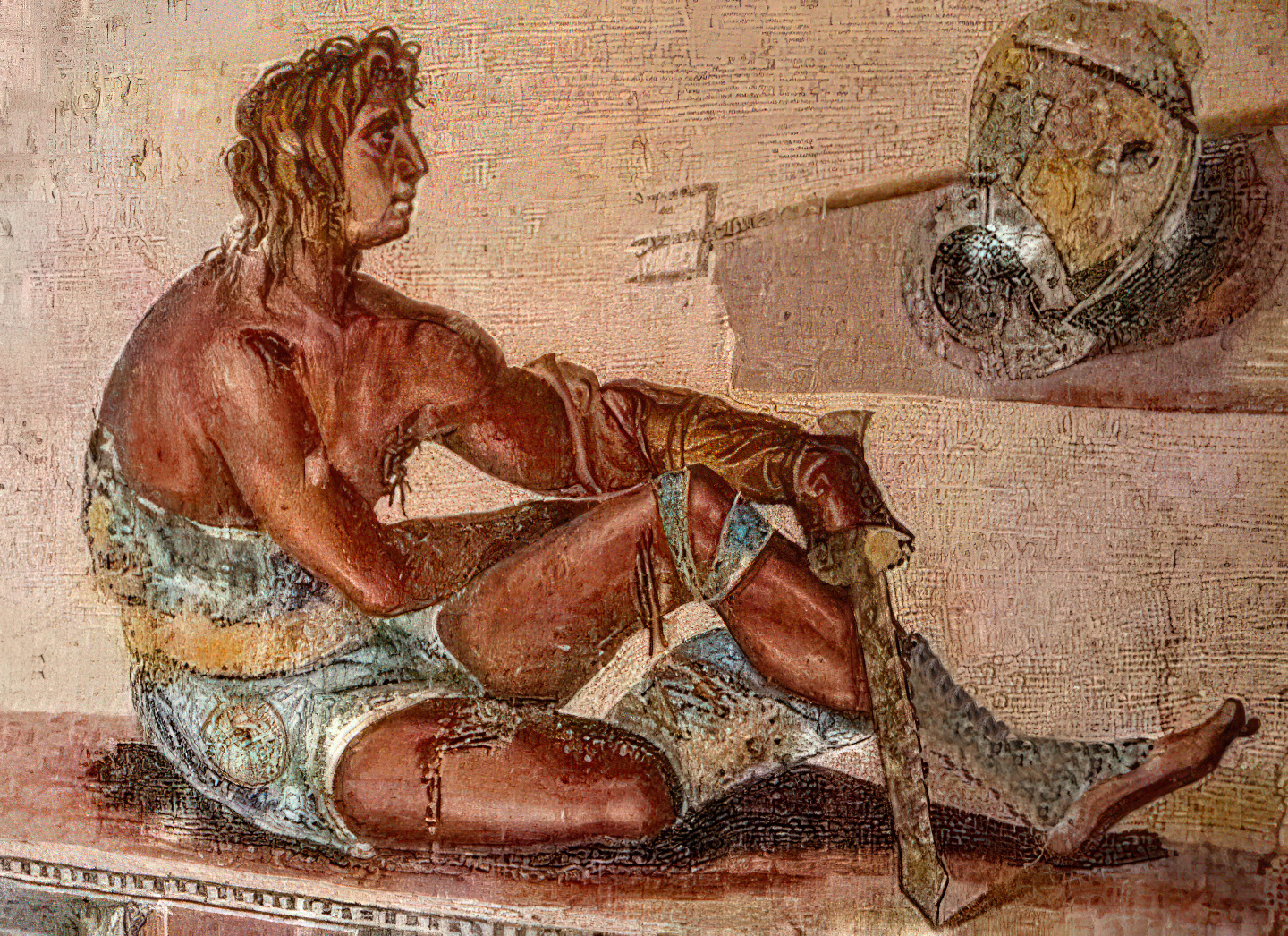
Mosaic showing a wounded gladiator in Leptis Magna, Roman Libya, 1st century AD

Under Augustus' rule, the demand for gladiators began to exceed supply, and matches sine missione were officially banned; an economical, pragmatic development that happened to match popular notions of "natural justice". When Caligula and Claudius refused to spare defeated but popular fighters, their own popularity suffered. In general, gladiators who fought well were likely to survive. At a Pompeian match between chariot-fighters, Publius Ostorius, with previous 51 wins to his credit, was granted missio after losing to Scylax, with 26 victories. By common custom, the spectators decided whether or not a losing gladiator should be spared, and chose the winner in the rare event of a standing tie. Even more rarely, perhaps uniquely, one stalemate ended in the killing of one gladiator by the editor himself. In any event, the final decision of death or life belonged to the editor, who signalled his choice with a gesture described by Roman sources as pollice verso meaning "with a turned thumb"; a description too imprecise for reconstruction of the gesture or its symbolism. Whether victorious or defeated, a gladiator was bound by oath to accept or implement his editor's decision, "the victor being nothing but the instrument of his [editor's] will." Not all editors chose to go with the crowd, and not all those condemned to death for putting on a poor show chose to submit:

Once a band of five retiarii in tunics, matched against the same number of secutores, yielded without a struggle; but when their death was ordered, one of them caught up his trident and slew all the victors. Caligula bewailed this in a public proclamation as a most cruel murder.

=== Death and disposal ===
A gladiator who was refused missio was dispatched by his opponent. To die well, a gladiator should never ask for mercy, nor cry out. A "good death" redeemed the gladiator from the dishonourable weakness and passivity of defeat, and provided a noble example to those who watched:

For death, when it stands near us, gives even to inexperienced men the courage not to seek to avoid the inevitable. So the gladiator, no matter how faint-hearted he has been throughout the fight, offers his throat to his opponent and directs the wavering blade to the vital spot. (Seneca. Epistles, 30.8)

Some mosaics show defeated gladiators kneeling in preparation for the moment of death. Seneca's "vital spot" seems to have meant the neck. Gladiator remains from Ephesus confirm this.

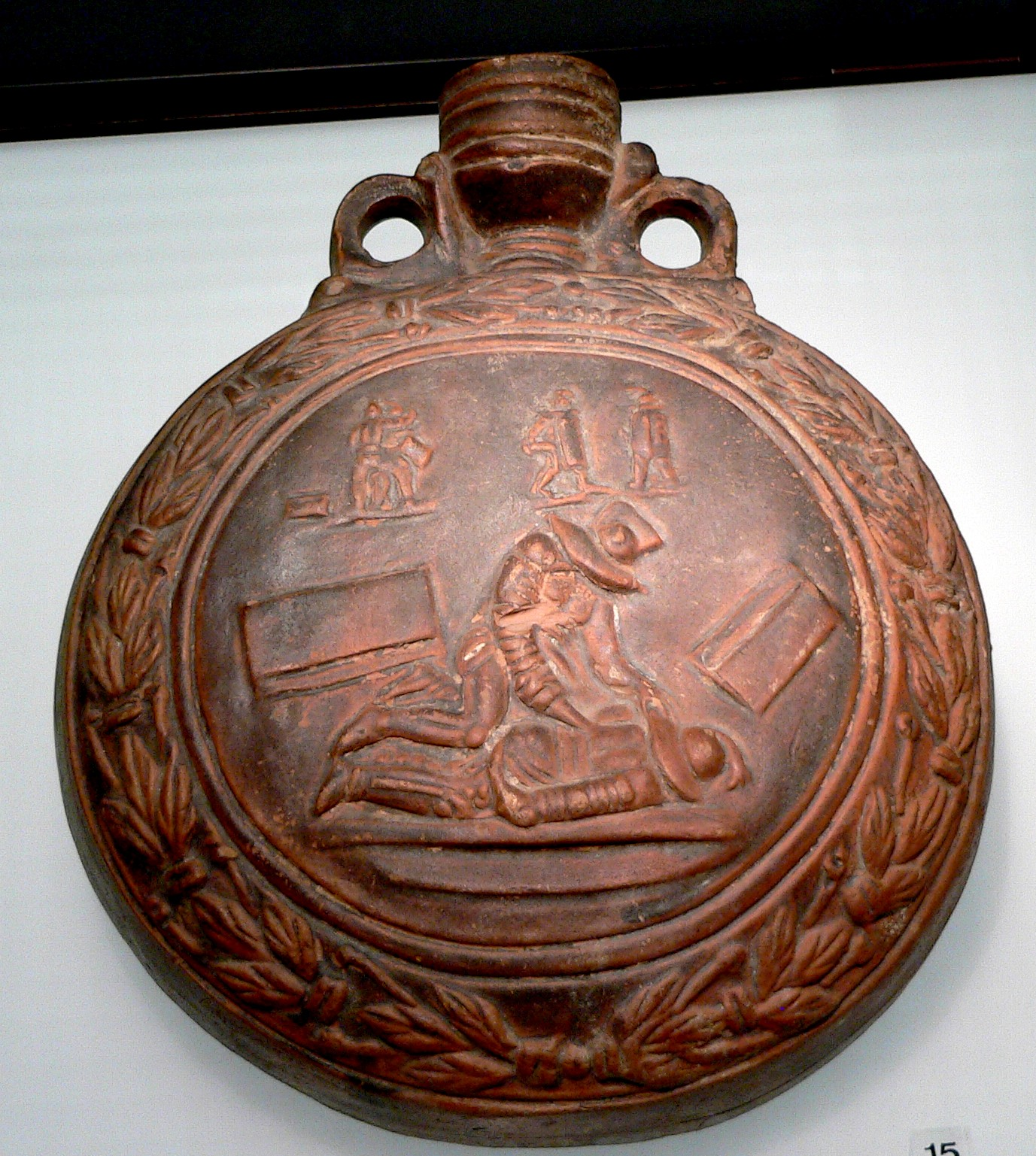
A flask depicting the final phase of the fight between a murmillo (winning) and a thraex

The body of a gladiator who had died well was placed on a couch of Libitina and removed with dignity to the arena morgue, where the corpse was stripped of armour, and probably had its throat cut as confirmation of death. The Christian author Tertullian, commenting on ludi meridiani in Roman Carthage during the peak era of the games, describes a more humiliating method of removal. One arena official, dressed as the "brother of Jove", Dis Pater (god of the underworld) strikes the corpse with a mallet. Another, dressed as Mercury, tests for life-signs with a heated "wand"; once confirmed as dead, the body is dragged from the arena.

Whether these victims were gladiators or noxii is unknown. Modern pathological examination confirms the probably fatal use of a mallet on some, but not all the gladiator skulls found in a gladiators' cemetery. Kyle (1998) proposes that gladiators who disgraced themselves might have been subjected to the same indignities as noxii, denied the relative mercies of a quick death and dragged from the arena as carrion. Whether the corpse of such a gladiator could be redeemed from further ignominy by friends or familia is not known.

The bodies of noxii, and possibly some damnati, were thrown into rivers or dumped unburied; Denial of funeral rites and memorial condemned the shade (manes) of the deceased to restless wandering upon the earth as a dreadful larva or lemur. Ordinary citizens, slaves and freedmen were usually buried beyond the town or city limits, to avoid the ritual and physical pollution of the living; professional gladiators had their own, separate cemeteries. The taint of infamia was perpetual.

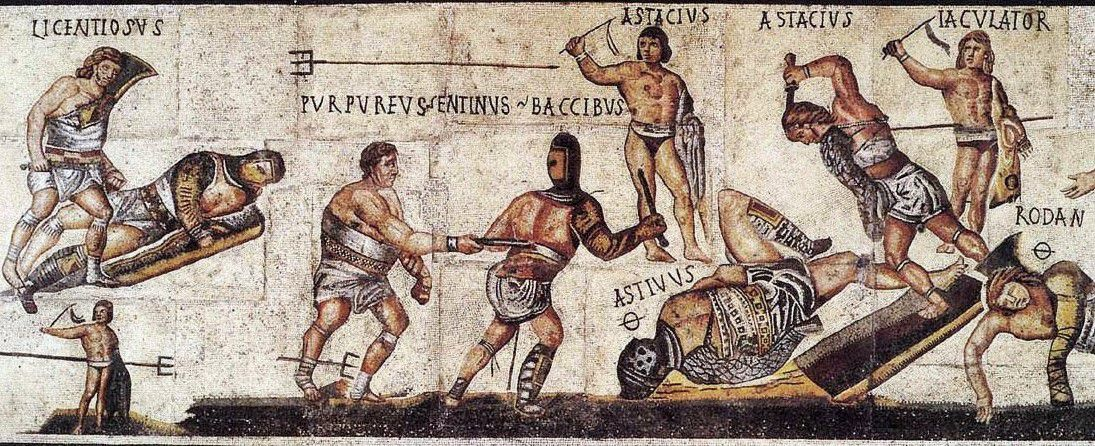
Part of the Gladiator Mosaic, displayed at the Galleria Borghese. It dates from approximately 320 AD. The Ø symbol is the theta nigrum ("black theta") or theta infelix ("unlucky theta"), a symbol of death in Greek and Latin epigraphy.

=== Remembrance and epitaphs ===
Gladiators could subscribe to a union (collegia), which ensured their proper burial, and sometimes a pension or compensation for wives and children. Otherwise, the gladiator's familia, which included his lanista, comrades and blood-kin, might fund his funeral and memorial costs, and use the memorial to assert their moral reputation as responsible, respectful colleagues or family members. Some monuments record the gladiator's career in some detail, including the number of appearances, victories—sometimes represented by an engraved crown or wreath—defeats, career duration, and age at death. Some include the gladiator's type, in words or direct representation: for example, the memorial of a retiarius at Verona included the engraving of a trident and sword. A wealthy editor might commission artwork to celebrate a particularly successful or memorable show, and include named portraits of winners and losers in action; the Borghese Gladiator Mosaic is a notable example. According to Cassius Dio, the emperor Caracalla gave the gladiator Bato a magnificent memorial and State funeral; more typical are the simple gladiator tombs of the Eastern Roman Empire, whose brief inscriptions include the following:

"The familia set this up in memory of Saturnilos."
"For Nikepharos, son of Synetos, Lakedaimonian, and for Narcissus the secutor. Titus Flavius Satyrus set up this monument in his memory from his own money."
"For Hermes. Paitraeites with his cell-mates set this up in memory".

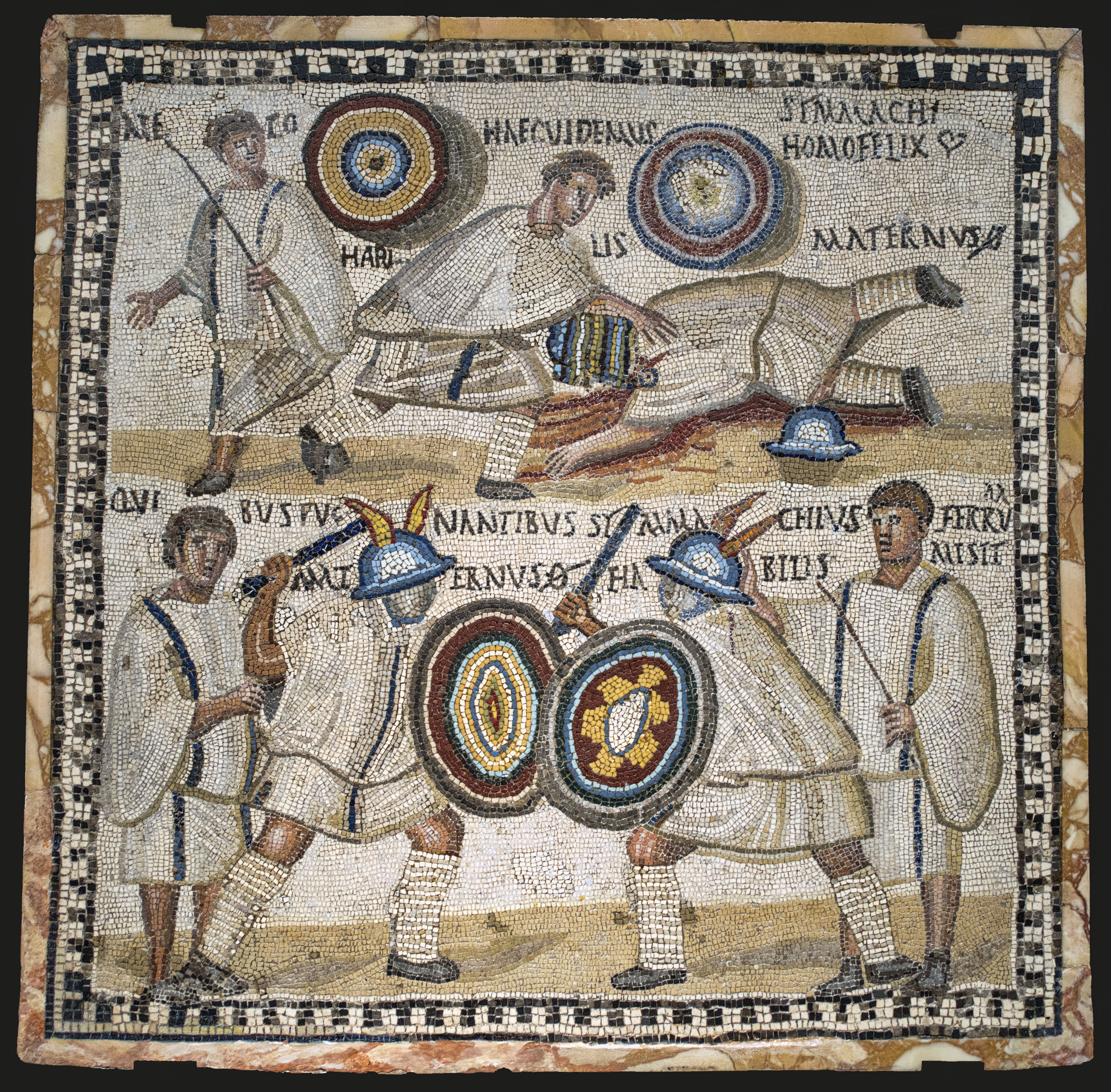
Mosaic depicting the fight between two gladiators named Simmachius and Maternus, 3rd century AD

Very little evidence survives of the religious beliefs of gladiators as a class, or their expectations of an afterlife. Modern scholarship offers little support for the once-prevalent notion that gladiators, venatores and bestiarii were personally or professionally dedicated to the cult of the Graeco-Roman goddess Nemesis. Rather, she seems to have represented a kind of "Imperial Fortuna" who dispensed Imperial retribution on the one hand, and Imperially subsidised gifts on the other—including the munera. One gladiator's tomb dedication clearly states that her decisions are not to be trusted. Many gladiator epitaphs claim Nemesis, fate, deception or treachery as the instrument of their death, never the superior skills of the flesh-and-blood adversary who defeated and killed them. Having no personal responsibility for his own defeat and death, the losing gladiator remains the better man, worth avenging.

"I, Victor, left-handed, lie here, but my homeland was in Thessalonica. Doom killed me, not the liar Pinnas. No longer let him boast. I had a fellow gladiator, Polyneikes, who killed Pinnas and avenged me. Claudius Thallus set up this memorial from what I left behind as a legacy."

=== Life expectancy ===
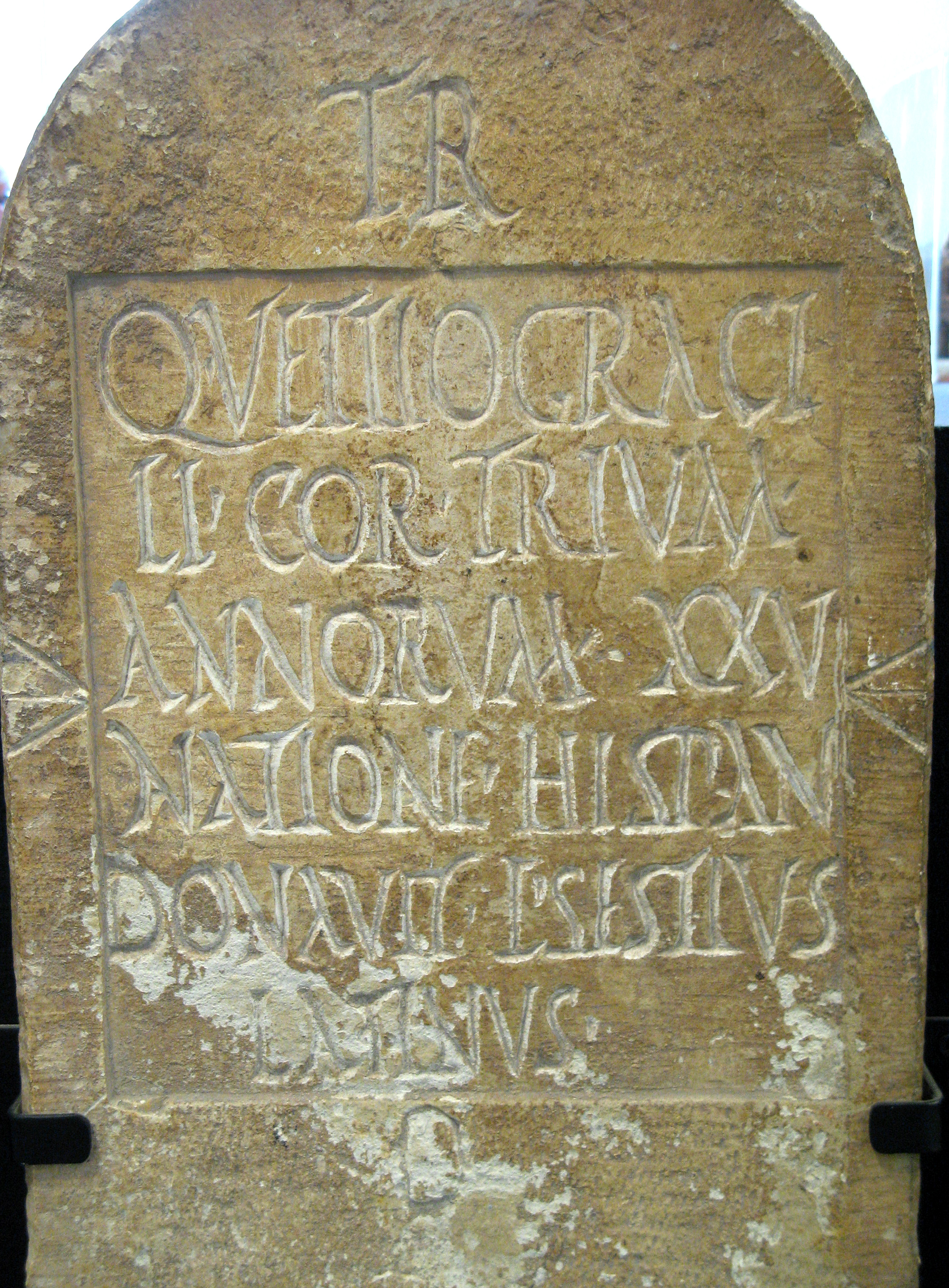
Inscription from Nîmes commemorating the thrax Quintus Vettius Gracilis, died age 25, born in Roman Spain

A gladiator might expect to fight in two or three munera annually, and an unknown number would have died in their first match. Few gladiators survived more than 10 contests, though one survived an extraordinary 150 bouts; and another died at 90 years of age, presumably long after retirement. A natural death following retirement is also likely for three individuals who died at 38, 45, and 48 years respectively. George Ville, using evidence from 1st century gladiator headstones, calculated an average age at death of 27, and mortality "among all who entered the arena" at 19/100. Marcus Junkelmann disputes Ville's calculation for average age at death; the majority would have received no headstone, and would have died early in their careers, at 18–25 years of age. Between the early and later Imperial periods the risk of death for defeated gladiators rose from 1/5 to 1/4, perhaps because missio was granted less often. Hopkins and Beard tentatively estimate a total of 400 arenas throughout the Roman Empire at its greatest extent, with a combined total of 8,000 deaths per annum from executions, combats and accidents.

== Schools and training ==
The earliest named gladiator school (singular: ludus; plural: ludi) is that of Aurelius Scaurus at Capua. He was lanista of the gladiators employed by the state circa 105 BC to instruct the legions and simultaneously entertain the public. Few other lanistae are known by name: they headed their familia gladiatoria, and had lawful power over life and death of every family member, including servi poenae, auctorati and ancillaries. Socially, they were infames, on a footing with pimps and butchers and despised as price gougers. No such stigma was attached to a gladiator owner (munerarius or editor) of good family, high status and independent means; Cicero congratulated his friend Atticus on buying a splendid troop—if he rented them out, he might recover their entire cost after two performances.

The Spartacus revolt had originated in a gladiator school privately owned by Lentulus Batiatus, and had been suppressed only after a protracted series of costly, sometimes disastrous campaigns by regular Roman troops. In the late Republican era, a fear of similar uprisings, the usefulness of gladiator schools in creating private armies, and the exploitation of munera for political gain led to increased restrictions on gladiator school ownership, siting and organisation. By Domitian's time, many had been more or less absorbed by the State, including those at Pergamum, Alexandria, Praeneste and Capua. The city of Rome itself had four; the Ludus Magnus (the largest and most important, housing up to about 2,000 gladiators), Ludus Dacicus, Ludus Gallicus, and the Ludus Matutinus, which trained bestiarii.

In the Imperial era, volunteers required a magistrate's permission to join a school as auctorati. If this was granted, the school's physician assessed their suitability. Their contract (auctoramentum) stipulated how often they were to perform, their fighting style and earnings. A condemned bankrupt or debtor accepted as novice (novicius) could negotiate with his lanista or editor for the partial or complete payment of his debt. Faced with runaway re-enlistment fees for skilled auctorati, Marcus Aurelius set their upper limit at 12,000 sesterces.

All prospective gladiators, whether volunteer or condemned, were bound to service by a sacred oath (sacramentum). Novices (novicii) trained under teachers of particular fighting styles, probably retired gladiators. They could ascend through a hierarchy of grades (singular: palus) in which primus palus was the highest. Lethal weapons were prohibited in the schools—weighted, blunt wooden versions were probably used. Fighting styles were probably learned through constant rehearsal as choreographed "numbers". An elegant, economical style was preferred. Training included preparation for a stoical, unflinching death. Successful training required intense commitment.

Those condemned ad ludum were probably branded or marked with a tattoo (stigma, plural stigmata) on the face, legs and/or hands. These stigmata may have been text—slaves were sometimes thus marked on the forehead until Constantine banned the use of facial stigmata in 325 AD. Soldiers were routinely marked on the hand.

Gladiators were typically accommodated in cells, arranged in barrack formation around a central practice arena. Juvenal describes the segregation of gladiators according to type and status, suggestive of rigid hierarchies within the schools: "even the lowest scum of the arena observe this rule; even in prison they're separate". Retiarii were kept away from damnati, and "fag targeteers" from "armoured heavies". As most ordinarii at games were from the same school, this kept potential opponents separate and safe from each other until the lawful munus. Discipline could be extreme, even lethal. Remains of a Pompeian ludus site attest to developments in supply, demand and discipline; in its earliest phase, the building could accommodate 15–20 gladiators. Its replacement could have housed about 100 and included a very small cell, probably for lesser punishments and so low that standing was impossible.

=== Diet and medical care ===
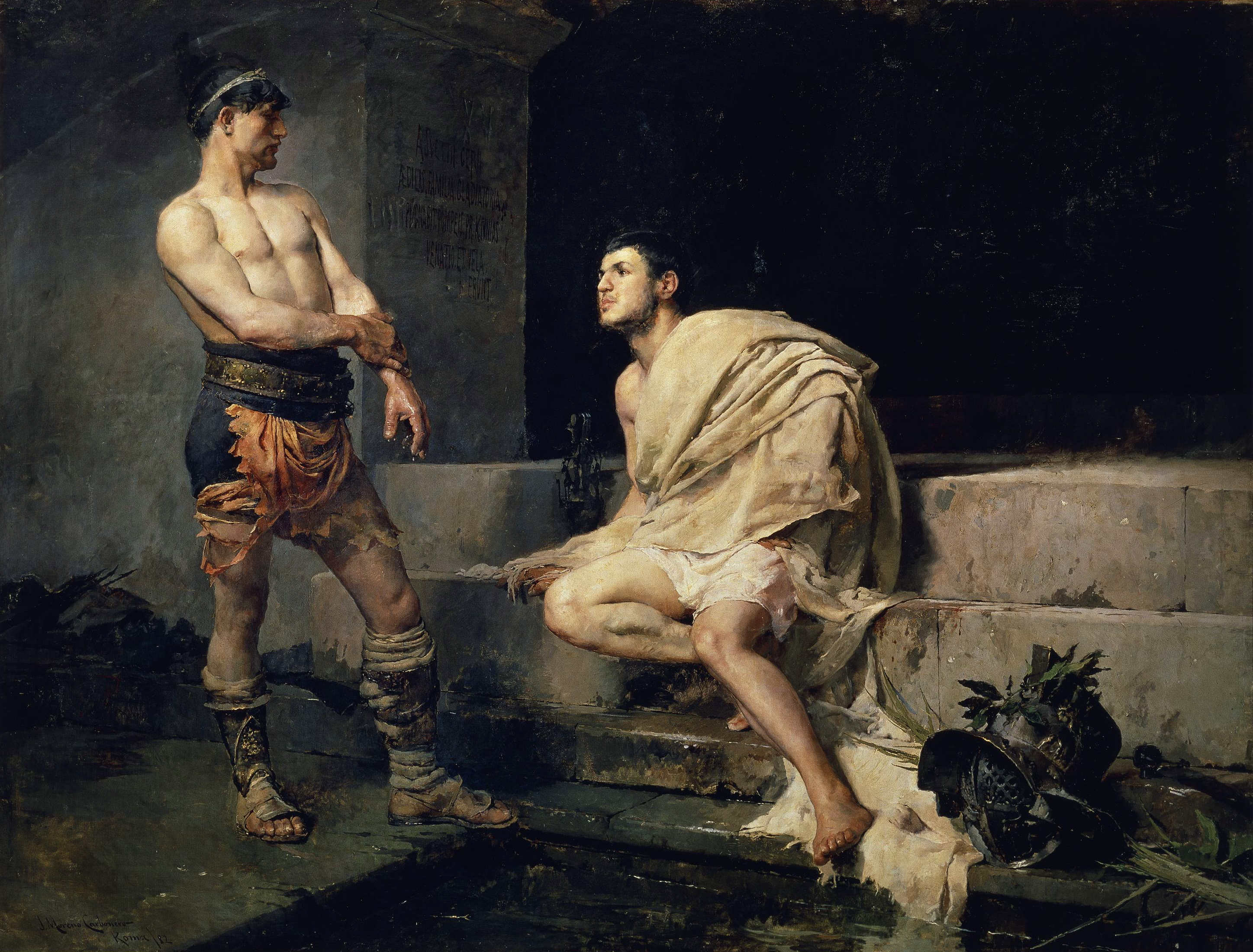
Gladiators after the fight, José Moreno Carbonero (1882)

Despite the harsh discipline, gladiators represented a substantial investment for their lanista and were otherwise well fed and cared for. Their daily, high-energy, vegetarian diet consisted of barley, boiled beans, oatmeal, ash and dried fruit. Gladiators were sometimes called hordearii (eaters of barley). Romans considered barley inferior to wheat—a punishment for legionaries replaced their wheat ration with it—but it was thought to strengthen the body. Regular massage and high quality medical care helped mitigate an otherwise very severe training regimen. Part of Galen's medical training was at a gladiator school in Pergamum where he saw (and would later criticise) the training, diet, and long-term health prospects of the gladiators.

== Legal and social status ==
"He vows to endure to be burned, to be bound, to be beaten, and to be killed by the sword." The gladiator's oath as cited by Petronius (Satyricon, 117).

Modern customs and institutions offer few useful parallels to the legal and social context of the gladiatoria munera. In Roman law, anyone condemned to the arena or the gladiator schools (damnati ad ludum) was a servus poenae (slave of the penalty), and was considered to be under sentence of death unless manumitted. A rescript of Hadrian reminded magistrates that "those sentenced to the sword" (execution) should be despatched immediately "or at least within the year", and those sentenced to the ludi should not be discharged before five years, or three years if granted manumission. Only slaves found guilty of specific offences could be sentenced to the arena; however, citizens found guilty of particular offenses could be stripped of citizenship, formally enslaved, then sentenced; and slaves, once freed, could be legally reverted to slavery for certain offences. Arena punishment could be given for banditry, theft and arson, and for treasons such as rebellion, census evasion to avoid paying due taxes and refusal to swear lawful oaths.

Offenders seen as particularly obnoxious to the state (noxii) received the most humiliating punishments. By the 1st century BC, noxii were being condemned to the beasts (damnati ad bestias) in the arena, with almost no chance of survival, or were made to kill each other. From the early Imperial era, some were forced to participate in humiliating and novel forms of mythological or historical enactment, culminating in their execution. Those judged less harshly might be condemned ad ludum venatorium or ad gladiatorium—combat with animals or gladiators—and armed as thought appropriate. These damnati at least might put on a good show and retrieve some respect and, very rarely, survive to fight another day. Some may even have become "proper" gladiators.

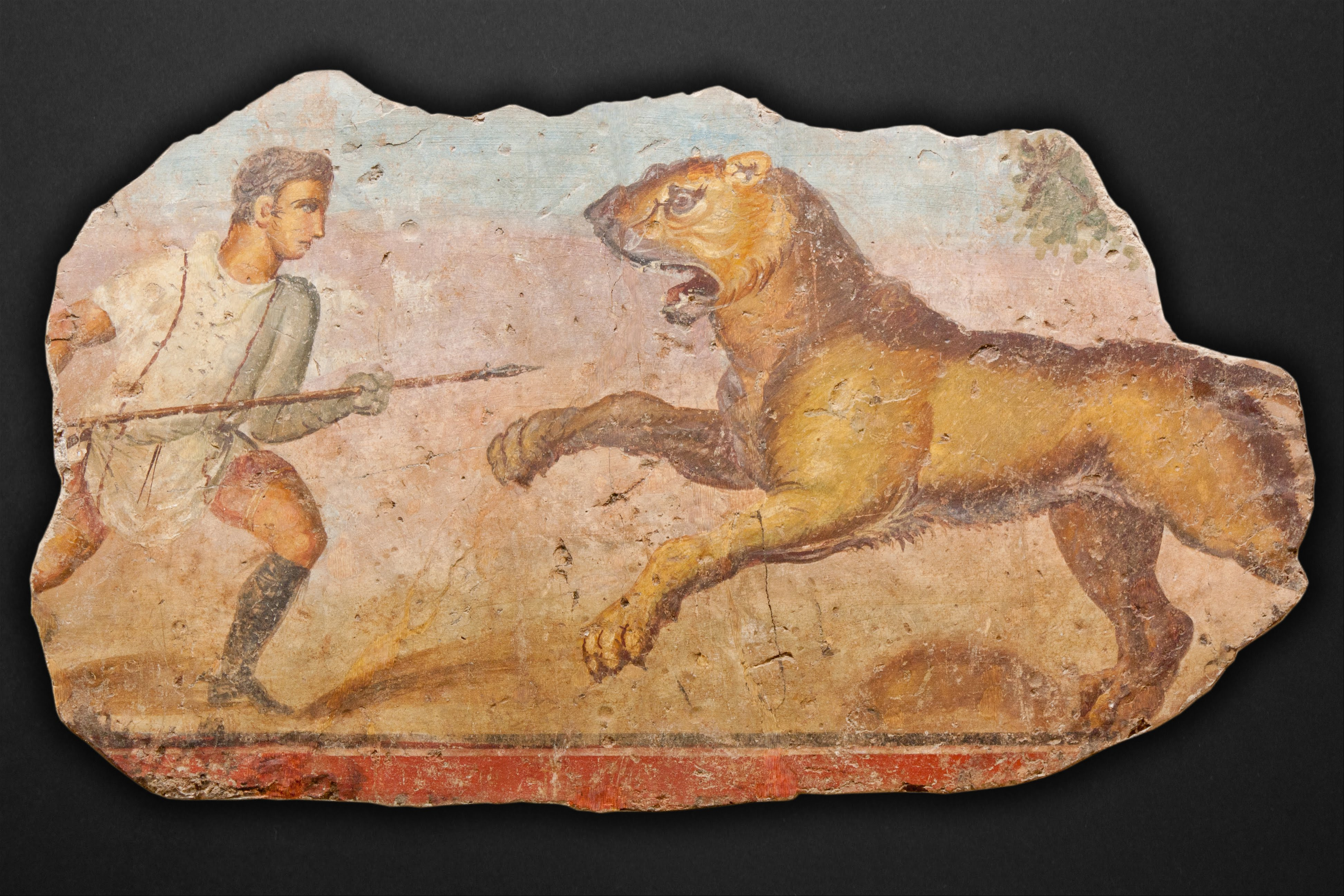
Mérida amphitheatre, Spain; mural of beast hunt, showing a venator (or bestiarius) and lioness

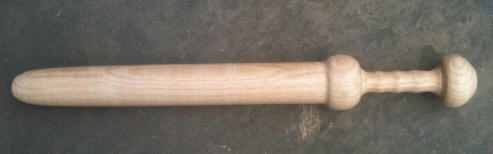
A rudis (plural: rudes) was given ceremonially to gladiators when they won enough battles to become free men

Among the most admired and skilled auctorati were those who, having been granted manumission, volunteered to fight in the arena. Some of these highly trained and experienced specialists may have had no other practical choice open to them. Their legal status—slave or free—is uncertain. Under Roman law, a freed gladiator could not "offer such services [as those of a gladiator] after manumission, because they cannot be performed without endangering [his] life." All contracted volunteers, including those of equestrian and senatorial class, were legally enslaved by their auctoratio because it involved their potentially lethal submission to a master. All arenarii (those who appeared in the arena) were "infames by reputation", a form of social dishonour which excluded them from most of the advantages and rights of citizenship. Payment for such appearances compounded their infamia. The legal and social status of even the most popular and wealthy auctorati was thus marginal at best. They could not vote, plead in court nor leave a will; and unless they were manumitted, their lives and property belonged to their masters. Nevertheless, there is evidence of informal if not entirely lawful practices to the contrary. Some "unfree" gladiators bequeathed money and personal property to wives and children, possibly via a sympathetic owner or familia; some had their own slaves and gave them their freedom. One gladiator was even granted "citizenship" to several Greek cities of the Eastern Roman world. When a gladiator earned their freedom or retirement, they were given a wooden rudis sword to signify proof of their freedom from slavery.

Caesar's munus of 46 BC included at least one equestrian, son of a Praetor, and two volunteers of possible senatorial rank. Augustus, who enjoyed watching the games, forbade the participation of senators, equestrians and their descendants as fighters or arenarii, but in 11 AD he bent his own rules and allowed equestrians to volunteer because "the prohibition was no use". Under Tiberius, the Larinum decree (19 AD) reiterated Augustus' original prohibitions. Thereafter, Caligula flouted them and Claudius strengthened them. Nero and Commodus ignored them. Even after the adoption of Christianity as Rome's official religion, legislation forbade the involvement of Rome's upper social classes in the games, though not the games themselves. Throughout Rome's history, some volunteers were prepared to risk loss of status or reputation by appearing in the arena, whether for payment, glory or, as in one recorded case, to revenge an affront to their personal honour. In one extraordinary episode, an aristocratic descendant of the Gracchi, already infamous for his marriage, as a bride, to a male horn player, appeared in what may have been a non-lethal or farcical match. His motives are unknown, but his voluntary and "shameless" arena appearance combined the "womanly attire" of a lowly retiarius tunicatus, adorned with golden ribbons, with the apex headdress that marked him out as a priest of Mars. In Juvenal's account, he seems to have relished the scandalous self-display, applause and the disgrace he inflicted on his more sturdy opponent by repeatedly skipping away from the confrontation.

== Amphitheatres ==
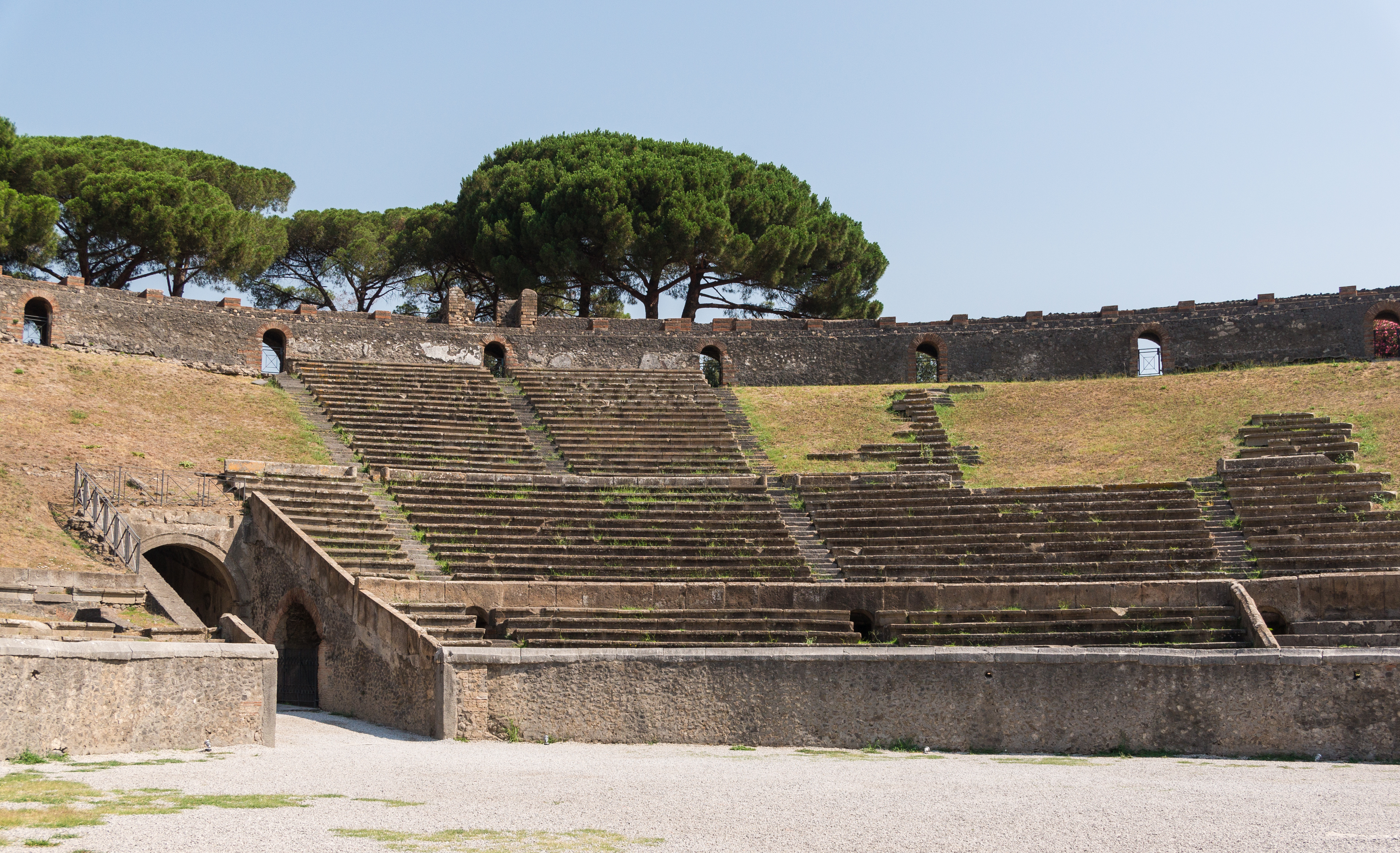
The Amphitheatre of Pompeii, built around 70 BC and buried by the eruption of Mount Vesuvius 79 AD, once hosted spectacles with gladiators.

As munera grew larger and more popular, open spaces such as the Forum Romanum were adapted (as the Forum Boarium had been) as venues in Rome and elsewhere, with temporary, elevated seating for the patron and high status spectators; they were popular but not truly public events:

A show of gladiators was to be exhibited before the people in the market-place, and most of the magistrates erected scaffolds round about, with an intention of letting them for advantage. Caius commanded them to take down their scaffolds, that the poor people might see the sport without paying anything. But nobody obeying these orders of his, he gathered together a body of labourers, who worked for him, and overthrew all the scaffolds the very night before the contest was to take place. So that by the next morning the market-place was cleared, and the common people had an opportunity of seeing the pastime. In this, the populace thought he had acted the part of a man; but he much disobliged the tribunes his colleagues, who regarded it as a piece of violent and presumptuous interference.

Towards the end of the Republic, Cicero (Murena, 72–73) still describes gladiator shows as ticketed—their political usefulness was served by inviting the rural tribunes of the plebs, not the people of Rome en masse–but in Imperial times, poor citizens in receipt of the corn dole were allocated at least some free seating, possibly by lottery. Others had to pay. Ticket scalpers (Locarii) sometimes sold or let out seats at inflated prices. Martial wrote that "Hermes [a gladiator who always drew the crowds] means riches for the ticket scalpers".

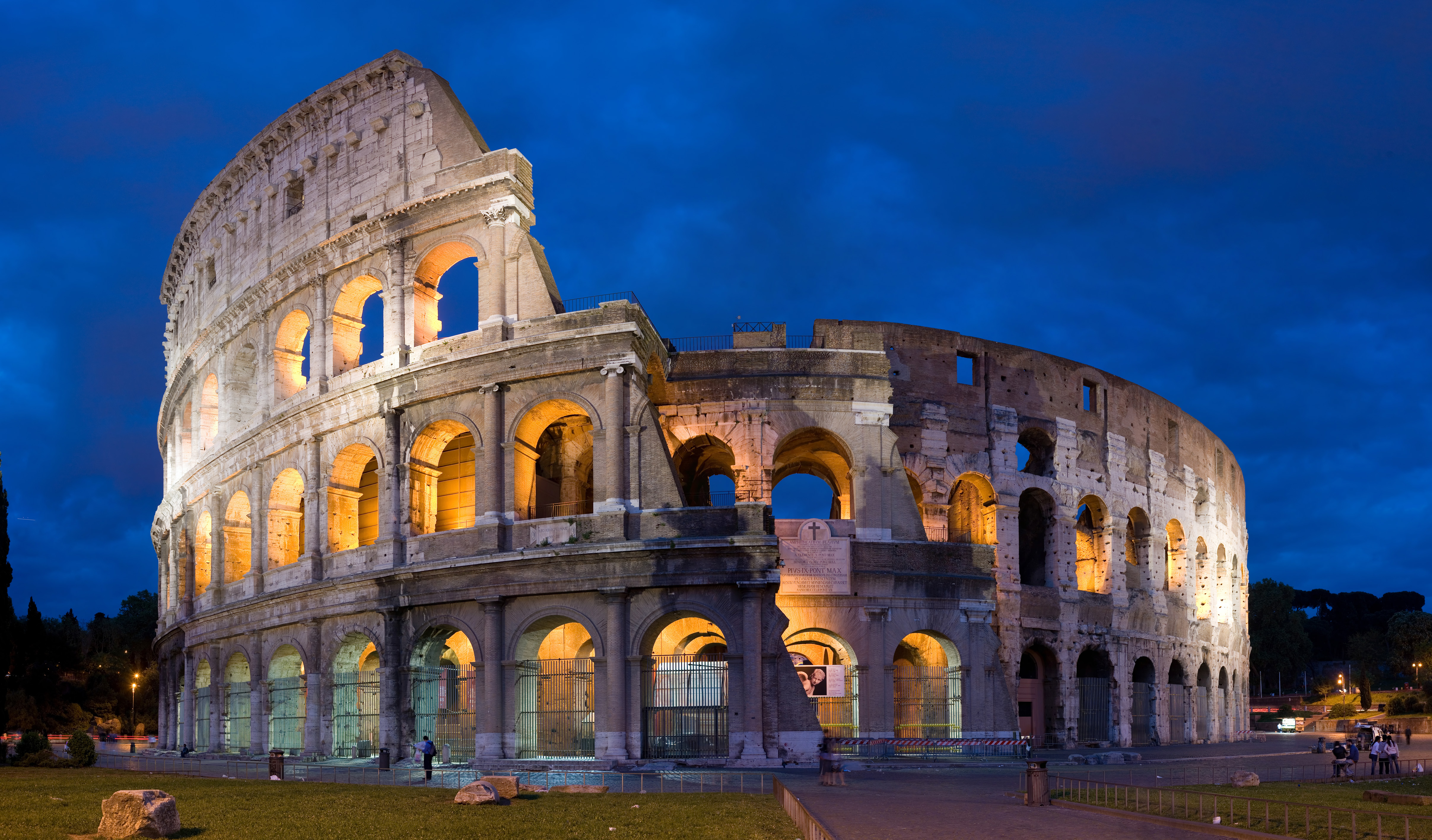
The Colosseum in Rome, Italy

The earliest known Roman amphitheatre was built at Pompeii by Sullan colonists, around 70 BC. The first in the city of Rome was the extraordinary wooden amphitheatre of Gaius Scribonius Curio (built in 53 BC). The first part-stone amphitheatre in Rome was inaugurated in 29–30 BC, in time for the triple triumph of Octavian (later Augustus). Shortly after it burned down in 64 AD, Vespasian began its replacement, later known as the Amphitheatrum Flavium (Colosseum), which seated 50,000 spectators and would remain the largest in the Empire. It was inaugurated by Titus in 80 AD as the personal gift of the Emperor to the people of Rome, paid for by the imperial share of booty after the Jewish Revolt.

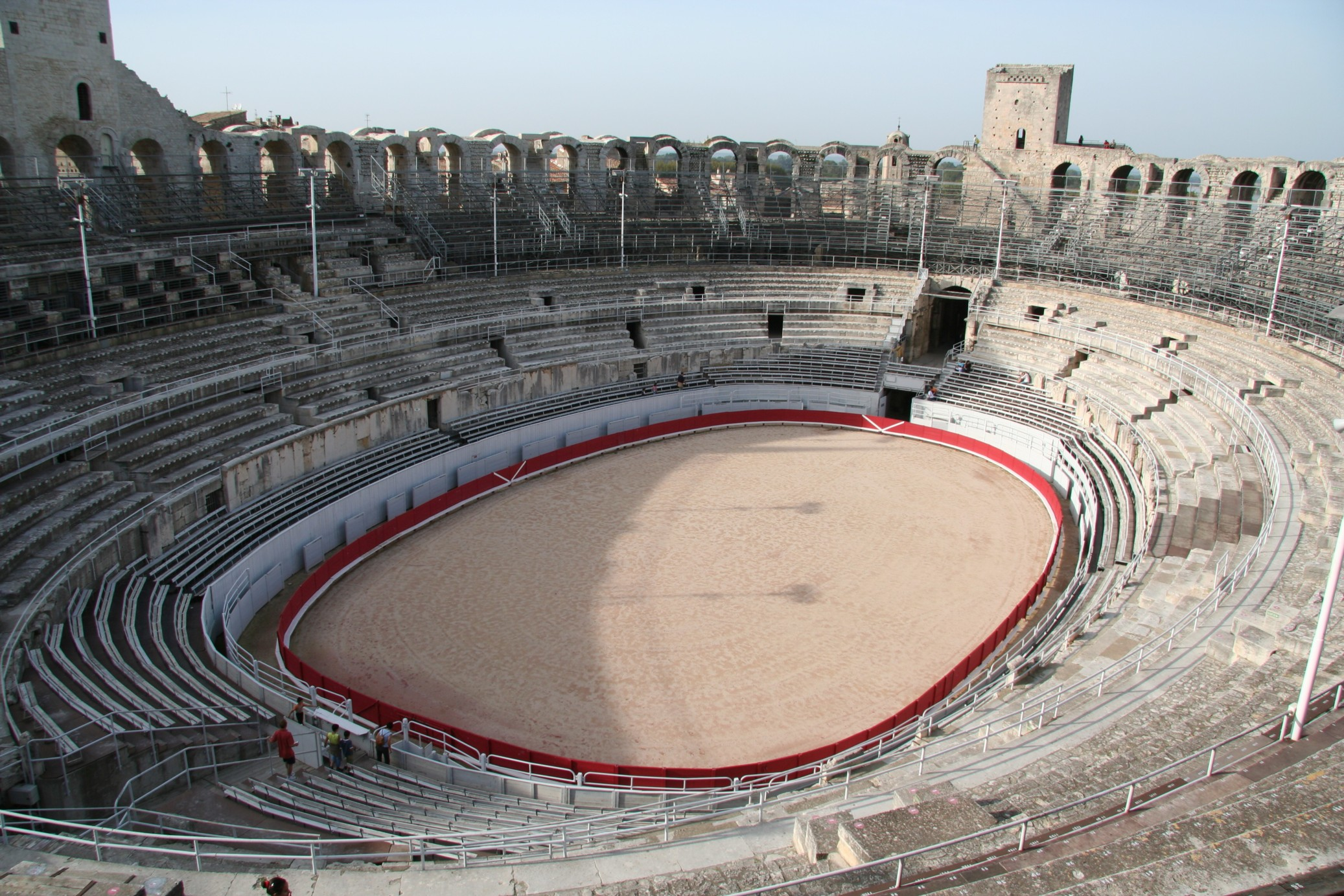
Arles Amphitheatre, inside view

Amphitheatres were usually oval in plan. Their seating tiers surrounded the arena below, where the community's judgments were meted out, in full public view. From across the stands, crowd and editor could assess each other's character and temperament. For the crowd, amphitheatres afforded unique opportunities for free expression and free speech (theatralis licentia). Petitions could be submitted to the editor (as magistrate) in full view of the community. Factiones and claques could vent their spleen on each other, and occasionally on Emperors. The emperor Titus's dignified yet confident ease in his management of an amphitheatre crowd and its factions were taken as a measure of his enormous popularity and the rightness of his imperium. The amphitheatre munus thus served the Roman community as living theatre and a court in miniature, in which judgement could be served not only on those in the arena below, but on their judges. Amphitheatres also provided a means of social control. Their seating was "disorderly and indiscriminate" until Augustus prescribed its arrangement in his Social Reforms. To persuade the Senate, he expressed his distress on behalf of a senator who could not find seating at a crowded games in Puteoli:

In consequence of this the senate decreed that, whenever any public show was given anywhere, the first row of seats should be reserved for senators; and at Rome he would not allow the envoys of the free and allied nations to sit in the orchestra, since he was informed that even freedmen were sometimes appointed. He separated the soldiery from the people. He assigned special seats to the married men of the commons, to boys under age their own section and the adjoining one to their preceptors; and he decreed that no one wearing a dark cloak should sit in the middle of the house. He would not allow women to view even the gladiators except from the upper seats, though it had been the custom for men and women to sit together at such shows. Only the Vestal virgins were assigned a place to themselves, opposite the praetor's tribunal.

These arrangements do not seem to have been strongly enforced.

=== Factions and rivals ===
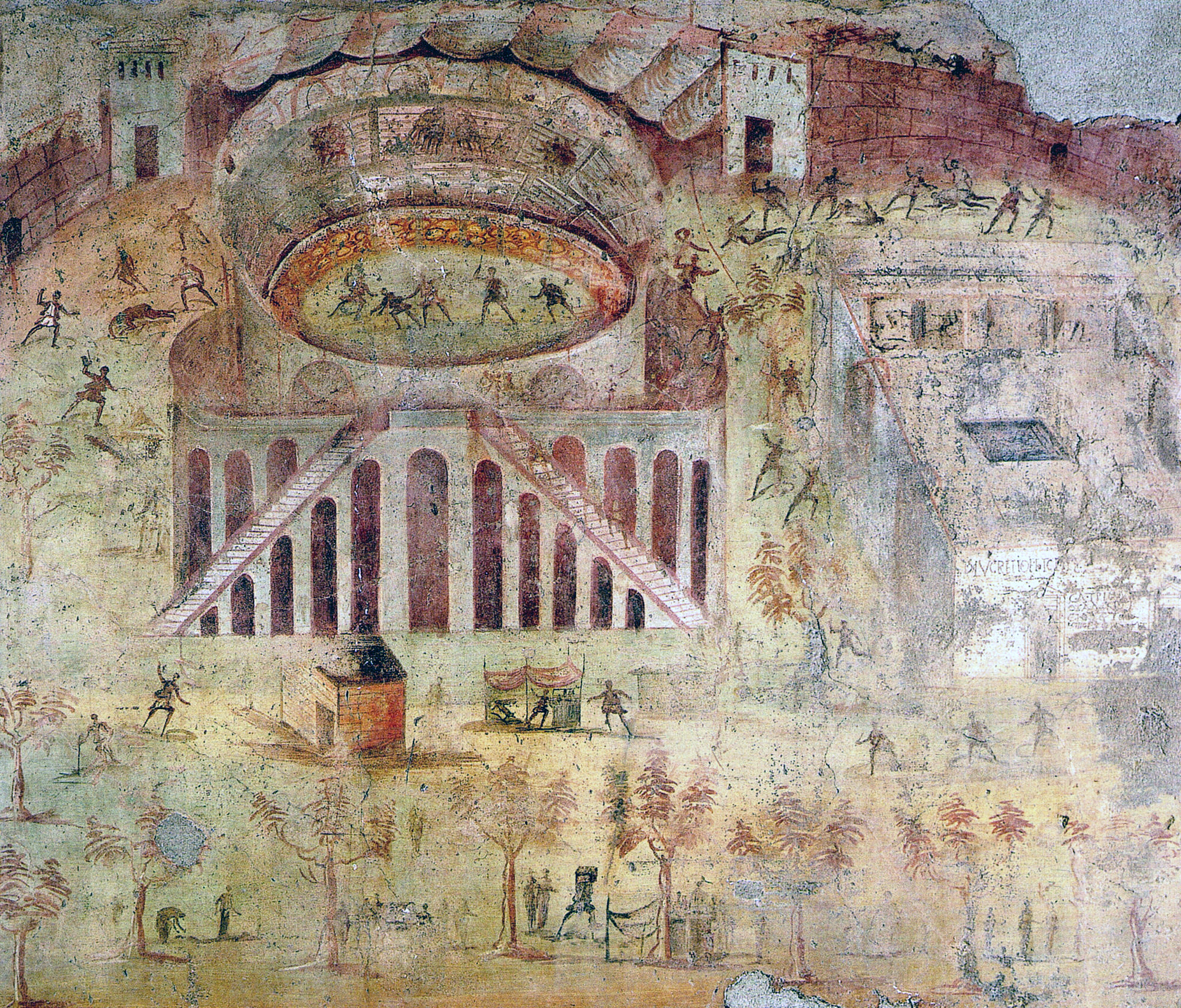
The Amphitheatre at Pompeii, depicting the riot between the Nucerians and the Pompeians

Popular factions supported favourite gladiators and gladiator types. Under Augustan legislation, the Samnite type was renamed Secutor ("chaser", or "pursuer"). The secutor was equipped with a long, heavy "large" shield called a scutum; Secutores, their supporters and any heavyweight secutor-based types such as the Murmillo were secutarii. Lighter types, such as the Thraex, were equipped with a smaller, lighter shield called a parma, from which they and their supporters were named parmularii ("small shields"). Titus and Trajan preferred the parmularii and Domitian the secutarii; Marcus Aurelius took neither side. Nero seems to have enjoyed the brawls between rowdy, enthusiastic and sometimes violent factions, but called in the troops if they went too far.

There were also local rivalries. At Pompeii's amphitheatre, during Nero's reign, the trading of insults between Pompeians and Nucerian spectators during public ludi led to stone throwing and riots. Many were killed or wounded. Nero banned gladiator munera (though not the games) at Pompeii for ten years as punishment. The story is told in Pompeian graffiti and high quality wall painting, with much boasting of Pompeii's "victory" over Nuceria.

== Role in Roman life ==
It is not known how many gladiatoria munera were given throughout the Roman period. Many, if not most, involved venationes, and in the later empire some may have been only that. In 165 BC, at least one munus was held during April's Megalesia. In the early imperial era, munera in Pompeii and neighbouring towns were dispersed from March through November. They included a provincial magnate's five-day munus of thirty pairs, plus beast hunts. A single late primary source, the Calendar of Furius Dionysius Philocalus for 354, shows how seldom gladiators featured among a multitude of official festivals. Of the 176 days reserved for spectacles of various kinds, 102 were for theatrical shows, 64 for chariot races and just 10 in December for gladiator games and venationes. A century before this, the emperor Alexander Severus (r. 222–235) may have intended a more even redistribution of munera throughout the year; but this would have broken with what had become the traditional positioning of the major gladiator games, at the year's ending. As Wiedemann points out, December was also the month for the Saturnalia, Saturn's festival, in which death was linked to renewal, and the lowest were honoured as the highest.

=== Role in the military ===
According to Livy: "A man who knows how to conquer in war is a man who knows how to arrange a banquet and put on a show."

Rome was essentially a landowning military aristocracy. From the early days of the Republic, ten years of military service were a citizen's duty and a prerequisite for election to public office. Devotio (willingness to sacrifice one's life to the greater good) was central to the Roman military ideal, and was the core of the Roman military oath. It applied from highest to lowest alike in the chain of command. As a soldier committed his life (voluntarily, at least in theory) to the greater cause of Rome's victory, he was not expected to survive defeat.

The Punic Wars of the late 3rd century BC—in particular the near-catastrophic defeat of Roman arms at Cannae—had long-lasting effects on the Republic, its citizen armies, and the development of the gladiatorial munera. In the aftermath of Cannae, Scipio Africanus crucified Roman deserters and had non-Roman deserters thrown to the beasts. The Senate refused to ransom Hannibal's Roman captives: instead, they consulted the Sibylline books, then made drastic preparations:

In obedience to the Books of Destiny, some strange and unusual sacrifices were made, human sacrifices amongst them. A Gaulish man and a Gaulish woman and a Greek man and a Greek woman were buried alive under the Forum Boarium ... They were lowered into a stone vault, which had on a previous occasion also been polluted by human victims, a practice most repulsive to Roman feelings. When the gods were believed to be duly propitiated ... Armour, weapons, and other things of the kind were ordered to be in readiness, and the ancient spoils gathered from the enemy were taken down from the temples and colonnades. The dearth of freemen necessitated a new kind of enlistment; 8,000 sturdy youths from amongst the slaves were armed at the public cost, after they had each been asked whether they were willing to serve or no. These soldiers were preferred, as there would be an opportunity of ransoming them when taken prisoners at a lower price.

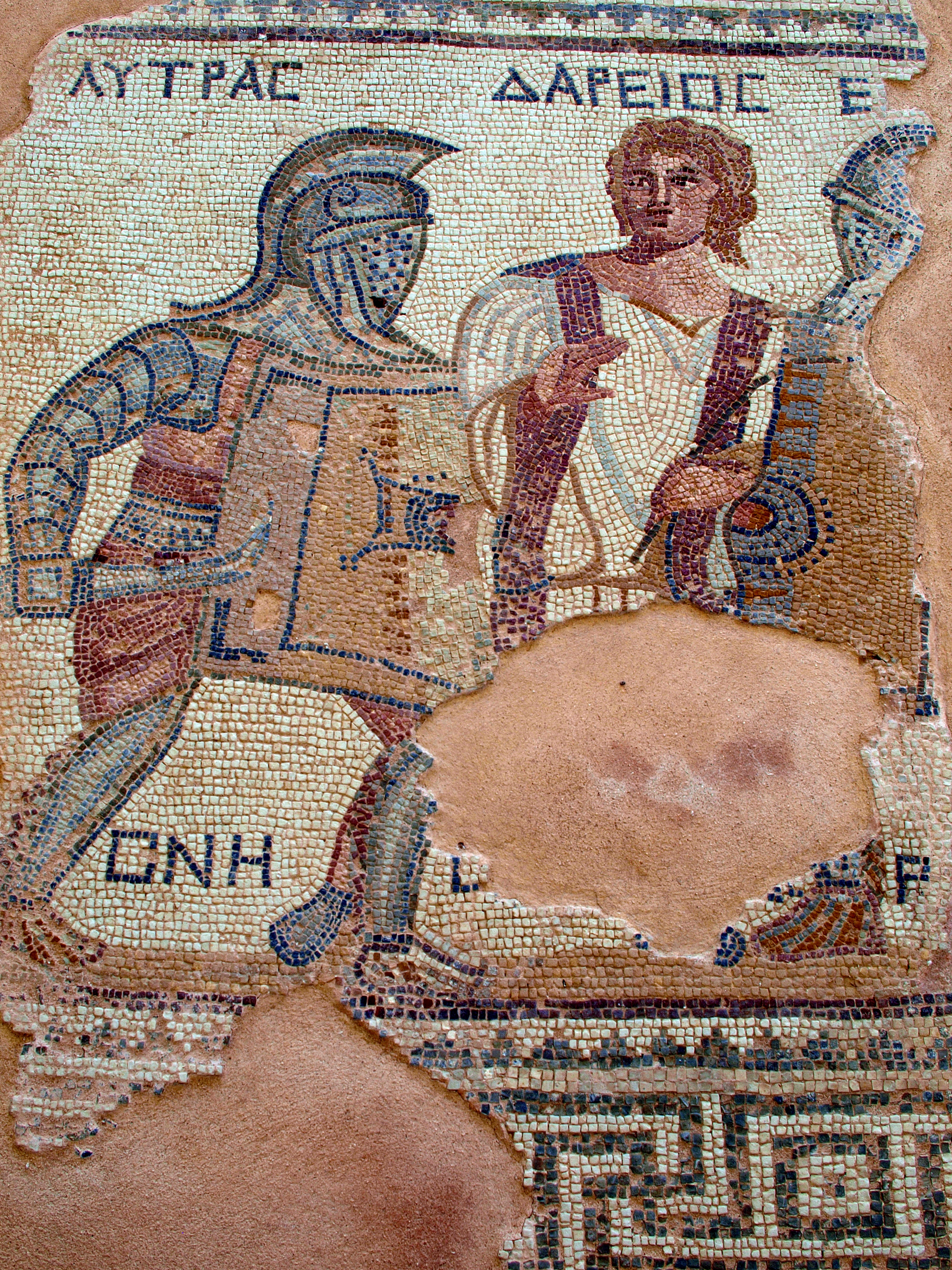
Late 3rd century gladiator mosaic from a private residence in Kourion, Cyprus. All the participants are named. The central figure (Darios) is positioned as a referee but wears a citizen's high-status toga or tunic with broad stripes

The account notes, uncomfortably, the bloodless human sacrifices performed to help turn the tide of the war in Rome's favour. While the Senate mustered their willing slaves, Hannibal offered his dishonoured Roman captives a chance for honourable death, in what Livy describes as something very like the Roman munus. The munus thus represented an essentially military, self-sacrificial ideal, taken to extreme fulfillment in the gladiator's oath. By the devotio of a voluntary oath, a slave might achieve the quality of a Roman (Romanitas), become the embodiment of true virtus (manliness, or manly virtue), and paradoxically, be granted missio while remaining a slave. The gladiator as a specialist fighter, and the ethos and organization of the gladiator schools, would inform the development of the Roman military as the most effective force of its time. Following defeat at the Battle of Arausio in 105 BC:

...weapons training was given to soldiers by P. Rutilius, consul with C. Mallis. For he, following the example of no previous general, with teachers summoned from the gladiatorial training school of C. Aurelus Scaurus, implanted in the legions a more sophisticated method of avoiding and dealing a blow and mixed bravery with skill and skill back again with virtue so that skill became stronger by bravery's passion and passion became more wary with the knowledge of this art.

The military were great aficionados of the games, and supervised the schools. Many schools and amphitheatres were sited at or near military barracks, and some provincial army units owned gladiator troupes. As the Republic wore on, the term of military service increased from ten to the sixteen years formalised by Augustus in the Principate. It would rise to twenty, and later, to twenty-five years. Roman military discipline was ferocious; severe enough to provoke mutiny, despite the consequences. A career as a volunteer gladiator may have seemed an attractive option for some.

In AD 69, the Year of the Four Emperors, Otho's troops at Bedriacum included 2000 gladiators. Opposite him on the field, Vitellius's army was swollen by levies of slaves, plebs and gladiators. In 167 AD, troop depletions by plague and desertion may have prompted Marcus Aurelius to draft gladiators at his own expense. During the Civil Wars that led to the Principate, Octavian (later Augustus) acquired the personal gladiator troop of his erstwhile opponent, Mark Antony. They had served their late master with exemplary loyalty but thereafter, they disappear from the record.

=== Religion, ethics and sentiment ===
Roman writing as a whole demonstrates a deep ambivalence towards the gladiatoria munera. Even the most complex and sophisticated munera of the Imperial era evoked the ancient, ancestral dii manes of the underworld and were framed by the protective, lawful rites of sacrificium. Their popularity made their co-option by the state inevitable; Cicero acknowledged their sponsorship as a political imperative. Despite the popular adulation of gladiators, they were set apart, despised; and despite Cicero's contempt for the mob, he shared their admiration: "Even when [gladiators] have been felled, let alone when they are standing and fighting, they never disgrace themselves. And suppose a gladiator has been brought to the ground, when do you ever see one twist his neck away after he has been ordered to extend it for the death blow?" His own death would later emulate this example. Yet, Cicero could also refer to his popularist opponent Clodius, publicly and scathingly, as a bustuarius—literally, a "funeral-man", implying that Clodius has shown the moral temperament of the lowest sort of gladiator. "Gladiator" could be (and was) used as an insult throughout the Roman period, and "Samnite" doubled the insult, despite the popularity of the Samnite type.

Silius Italicus wrote, as the games approached their peak, that the degenerate Campanians had devised the very worst of precedents, which now threatened the moral fabric of Rome: "It was their custom to enliven their banquets with bloodshed and to combine with their feasting the horrid sight of armed men [(Samnites)] fighting; often the combatants fell dead above the very cups of the revelers, and the tables were stained with streams of blood. Thus demoralised was Capua." Death could be rightly meted out as punishment, or met with equanimity in peace or war, as a gift of fate; but when inflicted as entertainment, with no underlying moral or religious purpose, it could only pollute and demean those who witnessed it.

The munus itself could be interpreted as pious necessity, but its increasing luxury corroded Roman virtue, and created an un-Roman appetite for profligacy and self-indulgence. Caesar's 46 BC ludi were mere entertainment for political gain, a waste of lives and of money that would have been better doled out to his legionary veterans. Yet for Seneca, and for Marcus Aurelius—both professed Stoics—the degradation of gladiators in the munus highlighted their Stoic virtues: their unconditional obedience to their master and to fate, and equanimity in the face of death. Having "neither hope nor illusions", the gladiator could transcend his own debased nature, and disempower death itself by meeting it face to face. Courage, dignity, altruism and loyalty were morally redemptive; Lucian idealised this principle in his story of Sisinnes, who voluntarily fought as a gladiator, earned 10,000 drachmas and used it to buy freedom for his friend, Toxaris. Seneca had a lower opinion of the mob's un-Stoical appetite for ludi meridiani: "Man [is]...now slaughtered for jest and sport; and those whom it used to be unholy to train for the purpose of inflicting and enduring wounds are thrust forth exposed and defenceless."

These accounts seek a higher moral meaning from the munus, but Ovid's very detailed (though satirical) instructions for seduction in the amphitheatre suggest that the spectacles could generate a potent and dangerously sexual atmosphere. Augustan seating prescriptions placed women—excepting the Vestals, who were legally inviolate—as far as possible from the action of the arena floor; or tried to. There remained the thrilling possibility of clandestine sexual transgression by high-caste spectators and their heroes of the arena. Such assignations were a source for gossip and satire but some became unforgivably public:

What was the youthful charm that so fired Eppia? What hooked her? What did she see in him to make her put up with being called "the gladiator's moll"? Her poppet, her Sergius, was no chicken, with a dud arm that prompted hope of early retirement. Besides his face looked a proper mess, helmet-scarred, a great wart on his nose, an unpleasant discharge always trickling from one eye. But he was a gladiator. That word makes the whole breed seem handsome, and made her prefer him to her children and country, her sister, her husband. Steel is what they fall in love with.

Eppia—a senator's wife–and her Sergius eloped to Egypt, where he deserted her. Most gladiators would have aimed lower. Two wall graffiti in Pompeii describe Celadus the Thraex as "the sigh of the girls" and "the glory of the girls"—which may or may not have been Celadus' own wishful thinking.

In the later Imperial era, Servius Maurus Honoratus uses the same disparaging term as Cicero—bustuarius—for gladiators. Tertullian used it somewhat differently—all victims of the arena were sacrificial in his eyes—and expressed the paradox of the arenarii as a class, from a Christian viewpoint:

On the one and the same account they glorify them and they degrade and diminish them; yes, further, they openly condemn them to disgrace and civil degradation; they keep them religiously excluded from council chamber, rostrum, senate, knighthood, and every other kind of office and a good many distinctions. The perversity of it! They love whom they lower; they despise whom they approve; the art they glorify, the artist they disgrace.

=== In Roman art and culture ===
In this new Play, I attempted to follow the old custom of mine, of making a fresh trial; I brought it on again. In the first Act I pleased; when in the meantime a rumor spread that gladiators were about to be exhibited; the populace flock together, make a tumult, clamor aloud, and fight for their places: meantime, I was unable to maintain my place.

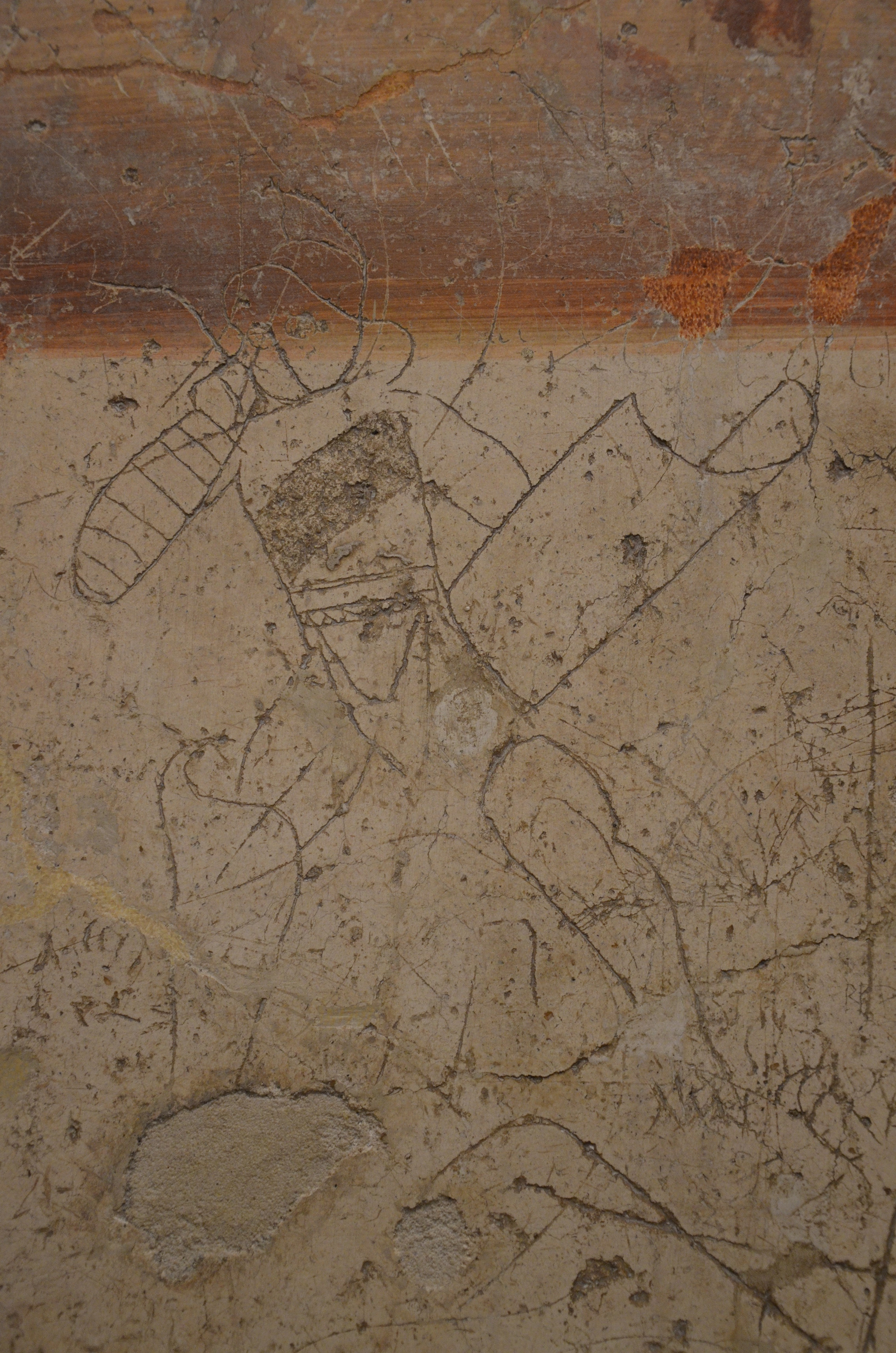
Graffito of a gladiatorial scene from Pompeii, Naples

Images of gladiators were found throughout the Republic and Empire, among all classes. Walls in the 2nd century BC "Agora of the Italians" at Delos were decorated with paintings of gladiators. Mosaics dating from the 2nd through 4th centuries AD have been invaluable in the reconstruction of combat and its rules, gladiator types and the development of the munus. Throughout the Roman world, ceramics, lamps, gems and jewellery, mosaics, reliefs, wall paintings and statuary offer evidence, sometimes the best evidence, of the clothing, props, equipment, names, events, prevalence and rules of gladiatorial combat. Earlier periods provide only occasional, perhaps exceptional examples. The Gladiator Mosaic in the Galleria Borghese displays several gladiator types, and the Bignor Roman Villa mosaic from Provincial Britain shows Cupids as gladiators. Souvenir ceramics were produced depicting named gladiators in combat; similar images of higher quality, were available on more expensive articles in high quality ceramic, glass or silver.

Some of the best preserved gladiator graffiti are from Pompeii and Herculaneum, in public areas including Pompeii's Forum and amphitheater, and in the private residences of the upper, middle and lower classes. They clearly show how gladiator munera pervaded Pompeiian culture; they provide information pertaining to particular gladiators, and sometimes include their names, status as slaves or freeborn volunteers, and their match records.

Pliny the Elder gives vivid examples of the popularity of gladiator portraiture in Antium and an artistic treat laid on by an adoptive aristocrat for the solidly plebeian citizens of the Roman Aventine:

When a freedman of Nero was giving a gladiatorial show at Antium, the public porticoes were covered with paintings, so we are told, containing life-like portraits of all the gladiators and assistants. This portraiture of gladiators has been the highest interest in art for many centuries now, but it was Gaius Terentius who began the practice of having pictures made of gladiatorial shows and exhibited in public; in honour of his grandfather who had adopted him he provided thirty pairs of Gladiators in the Forum for three consecutive days, and exhibited a picture of the matches in the Grove of Diana.

== Modern reconstructions ==
Some Roman reenactors attempt to recreate Roman gladiator troupes. Some of these groups are part of larger Roman reenactment groups, and others are wholly independent, though they might participate in larger demonstrations of Roman reenacting or historical reenacting in general. These groups usually focus on portraying mock gladiatorial combat in as accurate a manner as possible.

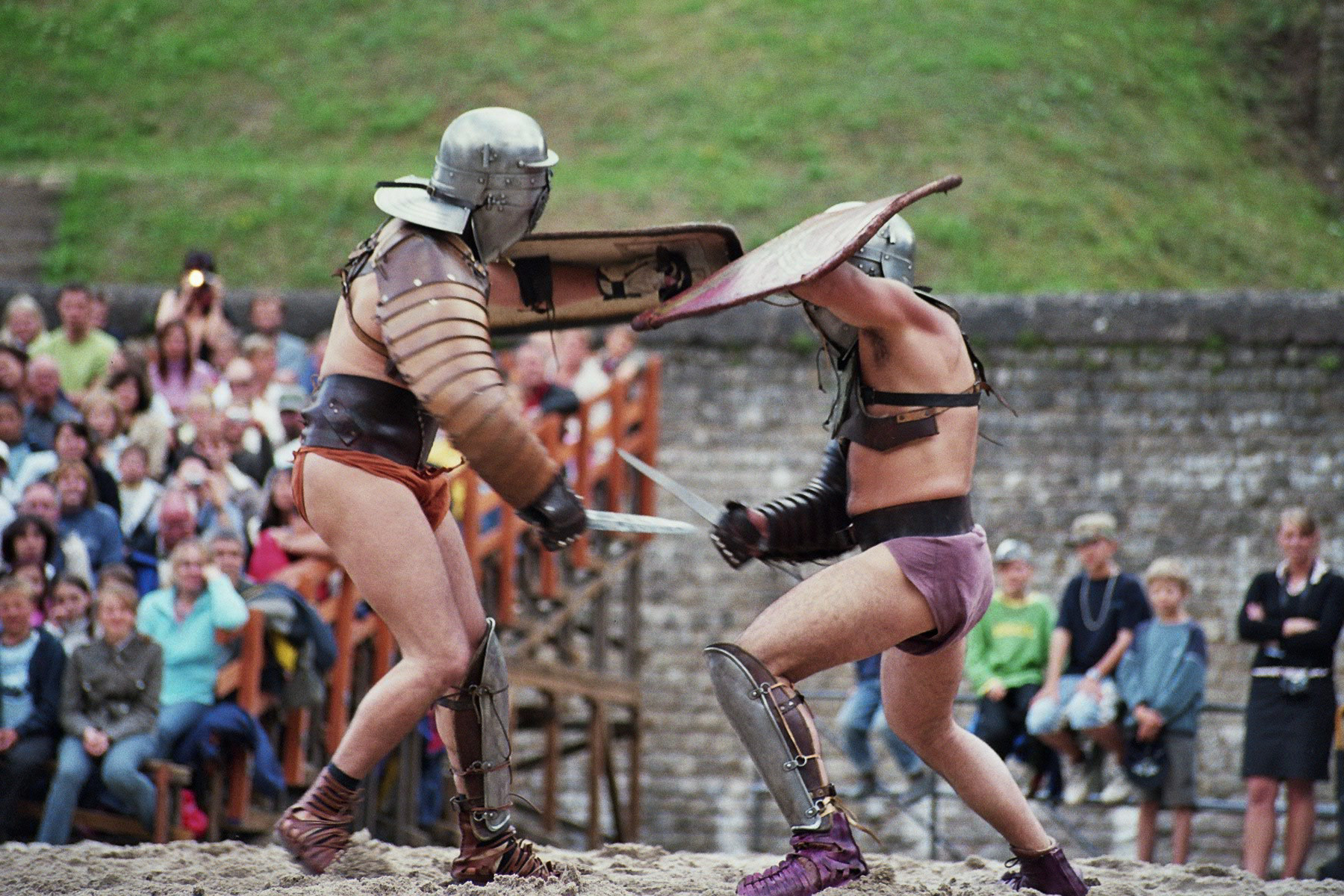
Gladiator show fight in Trier in 2005.

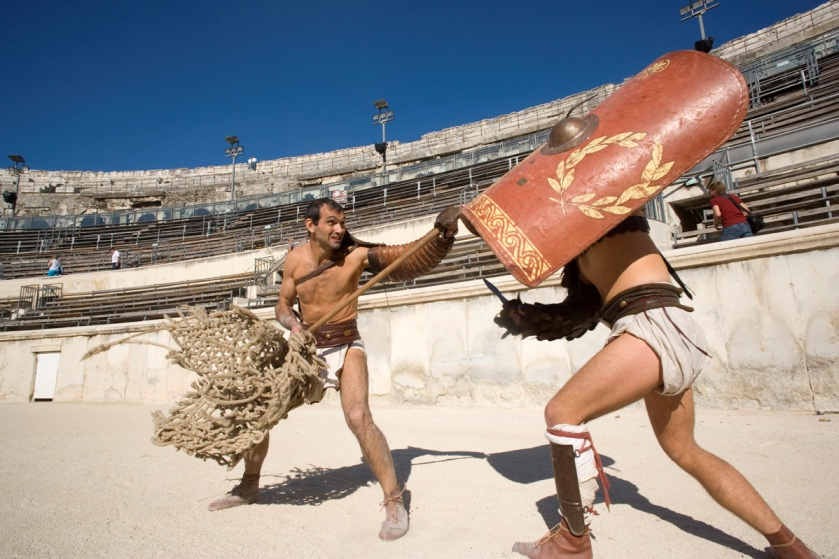
Nimes, 2005.

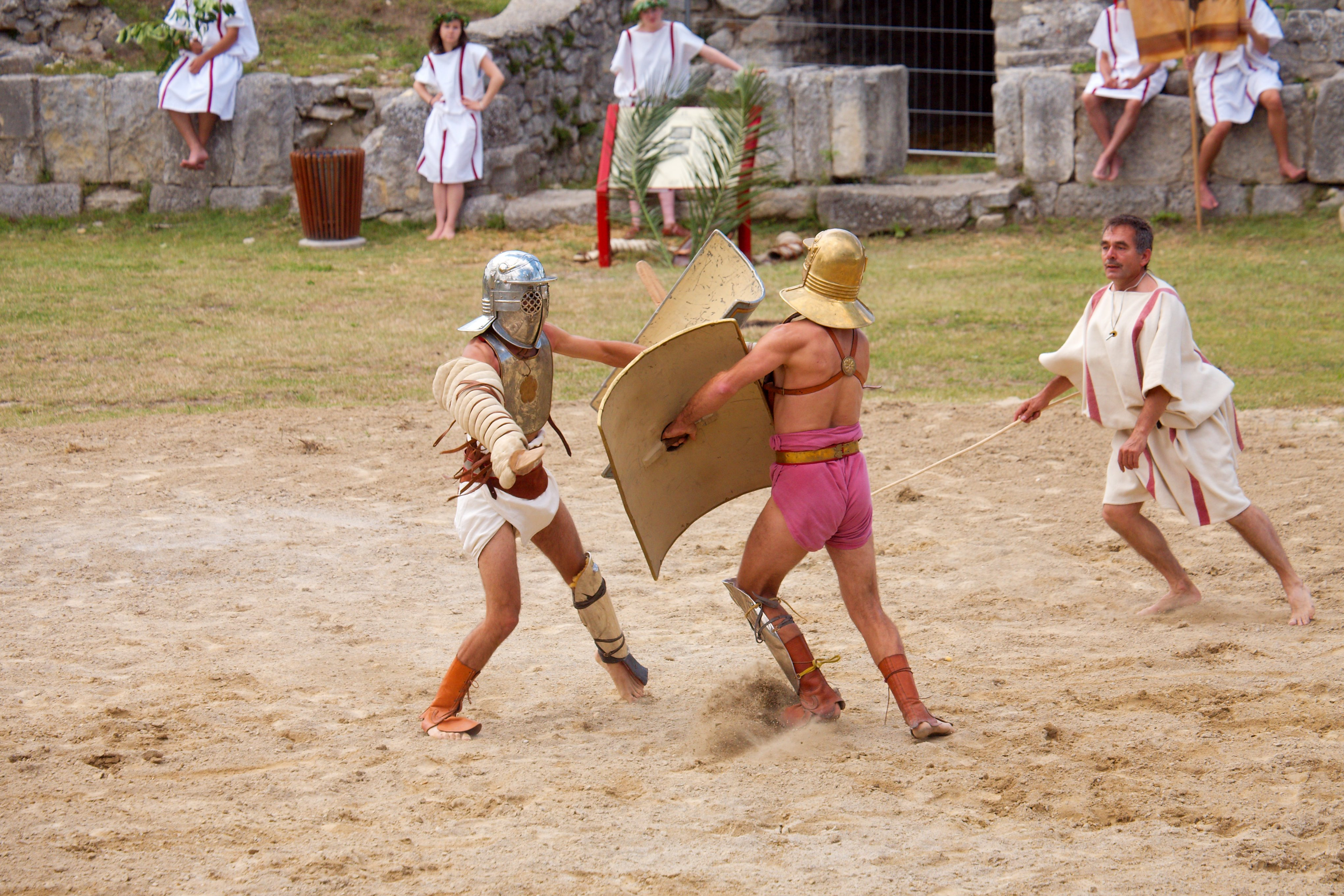
Carnuntum, Austria, 2007.

Video of a show fight at the Roman Villa Borg, Germany, in 2011 (Retiarius vs. Secutor, Thraex vs. Murmillo).

== See also ==
- Spectacles in ancient Rome
- Tournament (medieval)
- Hastilude
