= Zliten mosaic =

Roman floor mosaic

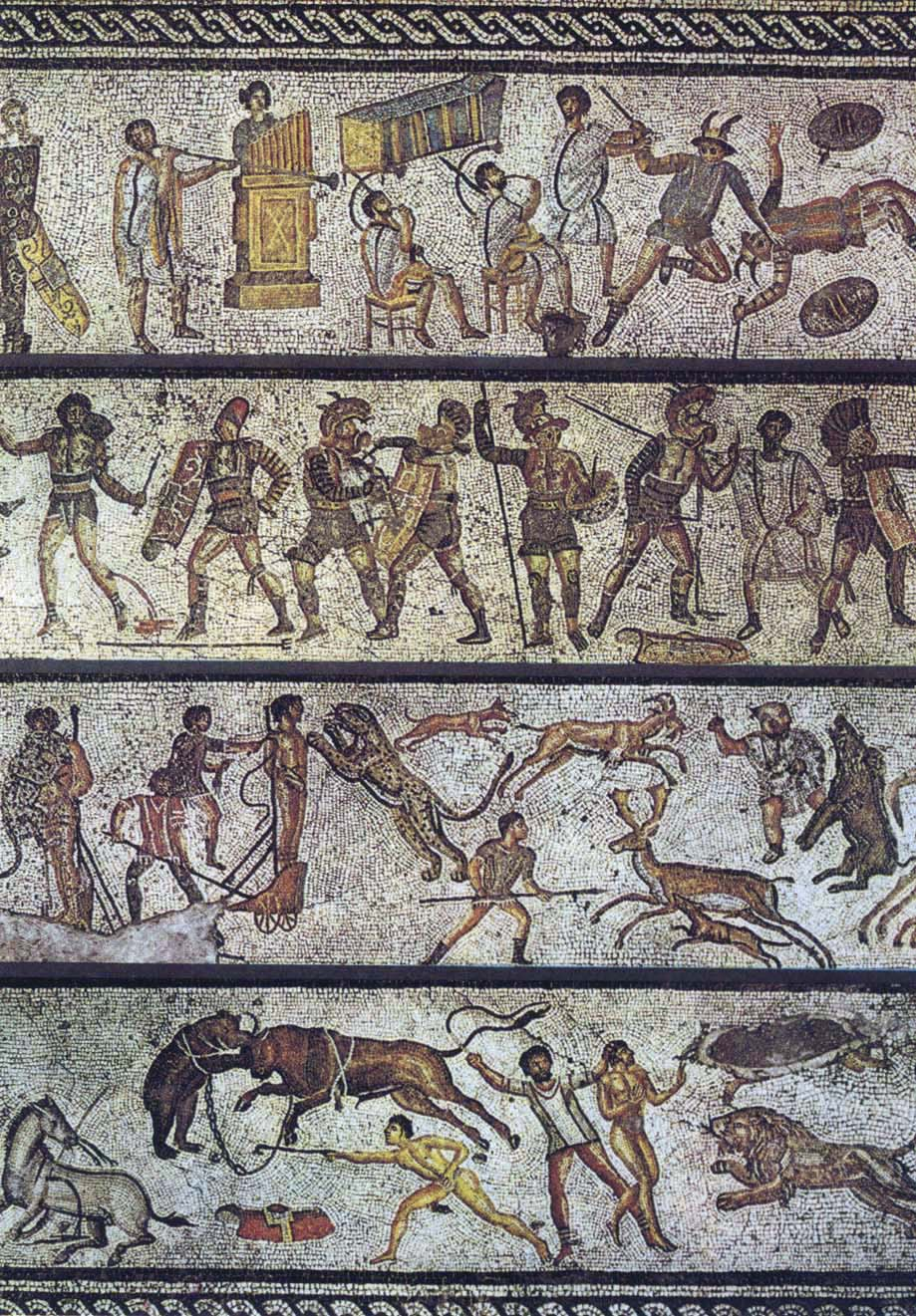
- Year: 2nd century AD
- Type: Mosaic
- Dimensions: 573 cm × 397 cm (18 ft 10 in × 13 ft 0 in)
- Location: The Archaeological Museum of Tripoli; Tripoli, Libya

The Zliten mosaic is a Roman floor mosaic from about the 2nd century AD, found in the town of Zliten in Libya, on the east coast of Leptis Magna. The mosaic was discovered by the Italian archaeologist Salvatore Aurigemma in 1913 and is now on display at The Archaeological Museum of Tripoli. It depicts gladiatorial contests, animal hunts, and scenes from everyday life.

== History ==
The mosaic was discovered in October 1913, in the ruins of a seaside Roman villa later called Villa Dar Buk Ammera after the area where it was found. When it was first fully unearthed and visible after the excavations conducted by Salvatore Aurigemma, from 22 June to 18 August 1914, it was immediately seen as a masterpiece of mosaic art, but one that was in urgent need of preservation and restoration. In the 1920s, the mosaic was restored and placed on display at The Archaeological Museum of Tripoli. It moved with the museum to its new location in 1952 and is displayed prominently near the entrance hall.

== Dating dispute ==
There have been various disputes related to the dating of the mosaic, mostly based on archaeological or stylistic comparisons, but the issue remains unresolved.

In his work on the Zliten mosaics, Mosaici di Zliten, 1926, Aurigemma offers an approximate dating period for the mosaic in the Flavian Dynasty years (69–96 AD). This chronology would make the mosaic one of the earliest known mosaics of North Africa. He asserts his hypothesis on three arguments:

1. The quality of the workmanship of a mosaic in the same villa, situated in an adjoining room, suggests dating as close as possible to the Augustan period (early 1st century AD).
2. The hairstyle of the woman figure shown playing the hydraulic organ is typical of the Flavian period.
3. The mosaic's depiction of the capital punishment of Damnatio ad bestias appears similar to records of the defeat of Garamantes recounted by Tacitus and dated at 70 AD.

In 1965, Georges Ville studied the mosaic based on the historical evidence provided by the costumes and weaponry of the protagonists in sections of the mosaic depicting venatio (hunting) and munus (swordsmanship). Ville found that the short-sleeved tunic and the hunters with bare, unprotected legs seem to belong to the late 1st or early 2nd century AD, whereas the type of thraex and murmillo’s helmets seem to be intermediary between that of Pompeii and that of the gladiator of Trajan period. Thus, Ville dates the mosaic from the end of the Flavian period to the early Antonine period (late 1st or early 2nd century).

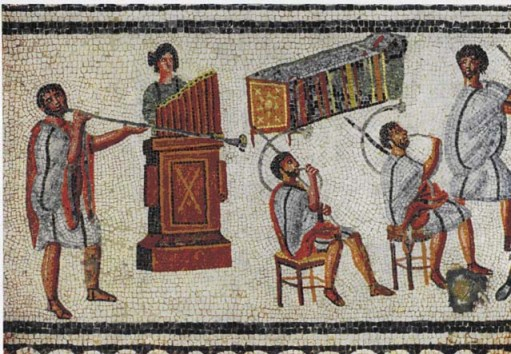
Detail of musicians playing a Roman tuba, a pipe organ (hydraulis), and a pair of cornua

Another stylistic comparative analysis by Roman art historian Christine Kondoleon supports an Antonine period dating as a result of the mosaic's multiple design elements. The Zliten floor mosaic employs tressed or braided twisted rope outlines to frame each panel, black backgrounds provide optical contrast and the panels alternate circular and square patterns. These features are in common with the Reggio Emilia mosaic, placed in the Antonine period. Kondoleon also asserts links between the individual designs of these mosaics, especially in the simplified floral forms and scale patterns. Finally, Kondoleon cites the inclusion of the peltarion, a type of Roman shield, as a further link in other Italian mosaics of the period.

In 1985, David Parrish, an art history professor, proposed 200 AD as the date of the mosaic, a date that coincides with the early Severan dynasty. In a comparison of the military equipment of the two Samnites in the Zliten mosaic with the warriors in the mosaic of Bad Kreuznach (Germany), dated c. 250 AD, Parrish emphasizes their similarities. He performed a similar comparison between the duels of retiarius and secutor in the Zliten mosaic and those of the mosaic of Nennig in Germany, dated c. 240-250 AD. Additionally, Parrish concludes that the mosaic of the El Djem amphitheatre, dated c. 200 AD, has particularly evident links to the Zliten mosaic in terms of the realistic rendering of space on white background, and the absence of shadows and isolated plots of land. This methodology is criticized by some scholars, including Roman art historian Katherine Dunbabin, for relying on overly broad stylistic parallels between the works.

Whoever designed the characters and figures [of this mosaic] had an incredibly exquisite artistic temperament - master of the form and model, robust and sensible; maybe he was a Greek, in any case a very great artist, who had naturally chosen artistic collaborators of the same quality, or who maybe had conducted himself the work on the mosaic. In any respect, he had inspired these characters - ready to die with great fanfare - with the sound of music and shouts of people, a life and a spirit that shouldn't die. One searches in vain for such a life (at least for such a degree of nobleness and power) in the other similar representations of gladiatorial combats (in painting and especially in sculpture) that have survived since antiquity to our days.

— Salvatore Aurigemma (translated from Italian)

== Composition ==
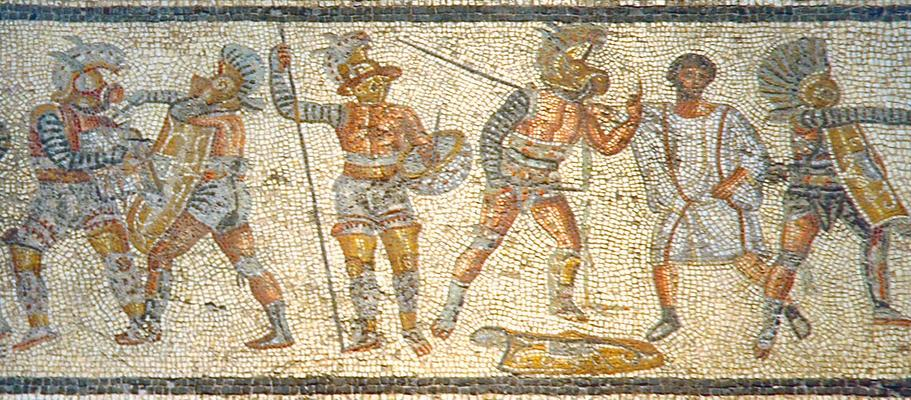
Gladiators from the Zliten mosaic.

Portions of the Zliten mosaic are realized through a combination of three techniques: opus tessellatum, opus vermiculatum and opus sectile.

The external black and white geometric border is created with the opus tessellatum technique.

The central part of the mosaic is composed of geometric alternating square panels with each side measuring 0.45 m (1.5 ft) and realized in the opus sectile technique. Within these panels are circular emblemata depicting fish and other marine creatures (shrimp, murex, picarel, conger, sea urchin, garfish etc...) in the opus vermiculatum technique.

== See also ==
- Antioch mosaics
- Mosaics
- Zliten
- Lepcis Magna
