= Hoplomachus =

Type of gladiator in ancient Rome

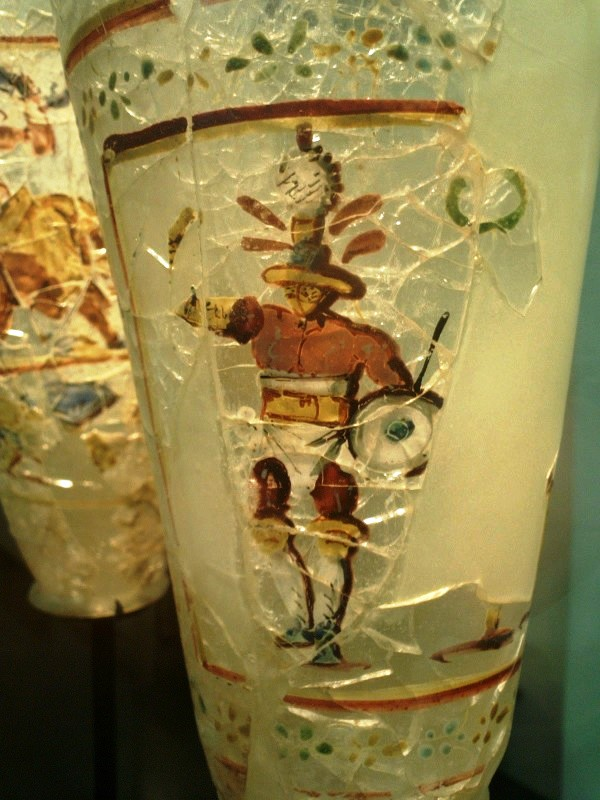
Hoplomachus, depicted on a Roman glass found in the Begram treasure.

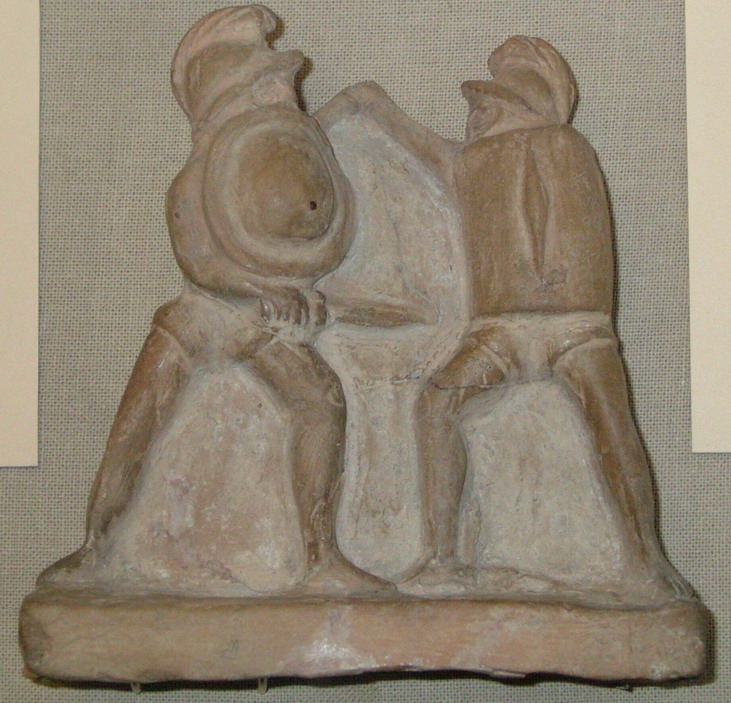
A hoplomachus (left) fights a thraex (right) (Terracotta, British Museum).

A hoplomachus (pl. hoplomachi) (hoplon meaning "equipment" in Greek) was a type of gladiator in ancient Rome, armed to resemble a Greek hoplite (soldier with heavy armor and helmet, a small, round, concave shield, a spear and a sword). The hoplomachus would wear a bronze helmet, a manica on his right arm, loincloth (subligaculum), heavy padding on his legs, and a pair of high greaves reaching to mid-thigh. His weapons were the spear and a short sword. He was often pitted against the murmillo (armed like a Roman soldier), perhaps as a re-enactment of Rome's wars in Greece and the Hellenistic East. The name hoplomachus means 'armored fighter'. The small, round shield was as much a weapon as a sword or spear, not unlike the original hoplites (who carried a larger shield), who used it primarily for defensive purposes, but also employed it in their charges, using it to ram their opponents at the onset of a fight. They wore no shoes so the sand would chafe their feet, presenting them a greater challenge.

His usual opponent was the murmillo, but he might fight the thraex in exceptional cases. Justus Lipsius conjectured that it was one of two designations of Samnite, and that Samnites were called hoplomachi when battling a thraex, and a secutor when matched against retiarii.

== Oplomachi ==
The oplomachi were a designation or possibly a class of Roman gladiator with relatively little mention in literary sources. They are often identified with the similarly named hoplomachus, but literary mentions do not seem to relate the two, despite the similarity of the names. According to Justus Lipsius, an oplomachus was one of two designations of Samnite; he conjectures that Samnite variants were called oplomachi when matched against a thraex, and a secutor when facing a retiarius. Though historical accounts identify them primarily as an opponent of the thraex, they appear in a Pompeian list as fighting not only against thraeces, but against murmillones and dimachaeri as well.

== See also ==
- List of Roman gladiator types
