= Samneh =

Samneh or samne (Arabic: سمنة) may refer to:

- Smen, a type of butter used in North African and Middle Eastern cuisines
- Georges Samné or Samneh (1877–1938), Syrian medical doctor, nationalist intellectual and writer
- Samneh, Hama, a village in Syria

== See also ==
- Samnis (disambiguation)
