= Dimachaerus =

Romans who fought with two swords

The dimachaeri (singular: dimachaerus) were a type of Roman gladiator that fought with two swords (dual wield). The name is a borrowing into Latin of Ancient Greek διμάχαιρος dimákhairos 'bearing two knives' (δι- di- 'two' + μάχαιρα mákhaira 'knife').

The dimachaeri were popular during the 2nd to 4th centuries CE, and were probably considered to be "insidious" by many Romans. Both written and pictorial records on dimachaeri are scant and rather indeterminate. Thus, an inscription from Lyon, France, mentions such a type of gladiator, here spelled dymacherus.

== Equipment ==
Depictions of dimachaeri and their equipment vary in pictorial sources, so it is difficult to say exactly how, and how uniformly, they were equipped. Some pictorial sources depict wearing extremely minimal such as a balteus and leather wrappings or none at all, save a subligaculum (loin cloth). Other show a slightly more heavily armored dimachaerus, variously equipped with scale armor, mail shirts, visored helmets in the fashion of murmillones, greaves and leg wrappings, both barefoot and in sandals. It is a mistake to suppose that dimachaeri were always identically equipped, or even similarly equipped, apart from wielding two blades. It is also entirely possible that the dimachaerus was not a separate class of gladiator at all, but a sub-discipline within a class, or even a cross-discipline practiced by multiple classes. In the late Roman Empire, when references to dimachaeri first appear, many novelties and new gladiator types were being introduced to the arena, and sub-classes had appeared within many gladiator types.

== Fighting style ==
The dimachaeri were equipped for close-combat fighting. A dimachaerus used a pair of sica (curved scimitar) or gladius and used a fighting style adapted to both attack and defend with his weapons rather than a shield, as he or she was not equipped with one. Little else is known about this class of gladiator, but due to the difficulty of wielding two swords it can be inferred that dimachaeri were ambidextrous or highly skilled and experienced fighters, and were probably relatively exalted as a class of gladiator. Dimachaeri would have been ideally suited to fight heavily armored opponents and they may have fought other dimachaeri as well. They are also referred to as fighting against hoplomachi, which, according to Justus Lipsius, was a putative variant of the Samnite.

== See also ==
- List of Roman gladiator types
