= Gladius (video game) =

2003 video game

- Developer: LucasArts
- Publisher: LucasArts
- Director: Robert Blackadder
- Producer: Rachel Bryant
- Programmer: Charlie Skilbeck
- Artist: Jim Rice
- Writers: Robert Blackadder; Justin Lambros
- Composer: Mark Griskey
- Platforms: GameCube; PlayStation 2; Xbox
- Release: PlayStation 2, Xbox: NA: October 28, 2003; EU: November 28, 2003; GameCube: NA: November 3, 2003; EU: November 28, 2003
- Genre: Tactical role-playing
- Modes: Single-player, multiplayer

Gladius is a 2003 tactical role-playing video game for GameCube, PlayStation 2, and Xbox. Developed and published by LucasArts, it was released for PlayStation 2 and Xbox in October 2003, and for GameCube in November. In December 2011, it was made available on the PlayStation Store, making it playable on the PlayStation 3, and in November 2021, it was added to Microsoft's backward compatibility program, making it playable on the Xbox One and Xbox Series X/S.

The game tells two different, albeit similar, stories involving the same two protagonists; Valens (the son of one of the greatest gladiators the world has ever known) and Ursula (the adventure-craving, magic-infused daughter of the barbarian king). In each storyline, the protagonists form a school of gladiators to compete at regional games but soon find themselves facing a potentially world-ending event when an evil sorceress sets out to resurrect the Dark God Mortuus, who once brought the world to near-ruin.

Gladius was well received by critics, who praised the depth of the combat mechanics, the range of equipment, the extensive customization options, and, especially, the implementation of a hit meter mechanic during combat. Common points of criticism included an insubstantial storyline, inconsistent graphics, and the game's length, with some critics feeling it was unnecessarily long.

== Gameplay ==
Gladius is a turn-based tactical role-playing game. There are two main gameplay components — combat and a world map. The primary game mechanic tasks the player with building a school of gladiators and taking them into battle against opposing schools, winning regional tournaments so as to earn the right to compete in more prestigious tournaments. Upon beginning the game, the player must choose their player character from two options; Valens runs a school in the Roman-like Imperia, whilst Ursula is a member of a school run by her brother in the Nordic-like Nordagh. The storyline plays out differently depending on which character is used, but the overarching gameplay is the same across both characters.

=== Combat ===
Combat in Gladius uses an interleaved turn-based system. The player issues an order to a gladiator (such as "move", "strike", or "defend") and the gladiator carries out that order. The player then either issues an order to another gladiator, or a computer controlled gladiator will perform an action, and so on. Each gladiator is free to move around the grid-pattern of the arena, but they can only move a certain distance per turn, determined by their character class, type of equipment, and status effects. This means that not every opponent is open to attack every turn. Different gladiators have different attacks and ranges, and an opponent must be within range for the attack option to be available to the player. Also important for attacking is the direction the opponent is facing and whether or not they are on elevated ground. When attacked from the side and from behind, Gladiators will take significantly more damage than when attacked from the front and will have no chance to block the attack. Gladiators on elevated ground receive less damage from those below them, whilst also causing more damage.

Screenshot of Gladius showing the HUD during a combat encounter. The image also shows the grid pattern which determines each player's movement range.

After issuing an attack order, the game presents the player with a "hit meter" that is used to determine the accuracy and effectiveness of the attack by having the player press a button or sequence of buttons at a particular time. All meters can be disabled in the options menu, with the game automatically and randomly determining the strength of attacks.

As well as a basic attack, each gladiator has access to certain skills. These skills are either active (the gladiator must be ordered to use them) or innate (they are activated automatically). As gladiators fight, they gain experience points, which eventually allows them to level up. When they do, they receive a number of "Job Points", which the player can use to purchase and/or upgrade skills. The available skills are different for each class of gladiator, and all skills are broken down into categories; attack, affinity (magic-infused attacks), combo, innate, and special (stat boosting, prompting crowd involvement, increasing initiative, etc.). To use active skills during combat, the gladiator must have sufficient skill points, which are built up at the rate of one per turn.

Affinity attacks are special attacks imbued with one of the game's six magic elements; earth, water, fire, wind, light, and dark. Each affinity attack requires a certain amount of affinity power before it can be used. The player can charge the gladiator's affinity power simply by attacking the enemy with a weapon imbued with that affinity. Once they have enough power, the player can then order an affinity attack. Armor and defensive equipment can also be imbued with an affinity. In this case, if a gladiator is attacked with a weapon imbued with the same affinity as their armor, they will receive very little damage.

There are several different types of combat in the game. The basic match type is to defeat all of the opponents. Other match types include timed combat where the team who scores the most hit points will win, timed combat where the team who break the most barrels will win, timed King of the Hill combat where the objective is to occupy the highest point in the arena and hold onto it for as long as possible, and combat where the first team to destroy the opposing team's statue will win. Different battles also have different restrictions; some battles will limit the player to using only gladiators of a particular class, affinity, or gender, meaning the player must build up a diverse school of different types of gladiators.

=== World map ===
There are four regions in the game. Depending on whether the player character is Valens or Ursula, the game begins in either Imperia and then moves to Nordagh (Valens), or Nordagh and then moves to Imperia (Ursula). Upon completion of these two regions, the game moves onto the Windward Steppes (grasslands region), followed by the Southern Expanse (desert region), before then returning to Imperia.

Within each region, there are multiple towns, each of which has an arena. Each arena hosts several leagues, and each league hosts several battles. The player must win enough battles to win the league, and enough leagues to compete in the town's tournament. Once all the town tournaments have been completed, a regional tournament becomes available. The player must win the regional tournament to be able to move on to the next region.

Travel between the towns takes place on the world map, with the player free to visit any town in the region. As well as facilitating travel, the world map also features merchants who sell items not available in the regular shops, and NPCs to whom the player can speak, possibly getting side quests, hints, or local history. As in traditional RPGs, the world map features random combat encounters. Unlike in the arenas, however, if a gladiator is killed in a random encounter, they are permanently removed from the player's school. If the player character is defeated, it is game over and the player must reload from the last save.

The menu system is available within each town and is where the player selects the league in which to compete, accesses the shop, recruits gladiators to their school, and learns the background of the town. Players can also examine their gladiatorial school via submenus that allow them to read journals, equip their gladiators, customise each gladiator's appearance, examine their gladiators' stats, access a "rogues gallery" of defeated enemies, check to see what leagues the school has won, access a Q&A about the game, expel gladiators from their school, and spend job points to upgrade their gladiators' skills.

=== Multiplayer ===
There are two multiplayer modes. Co-op allows up to four players (two on PlayStation 2) to play side-by-side in story mode. The first player controls the movement on the world map and the menu screens. Once that player has entered a battle, the other player(s) can control the gladiators of their choice. The other multiplayer mode is Versus, where up to four players (two on PlayStation 2) can compete in exhibition battles. This mode only becomes available when the player has reached Chapter II in the single-player game.

== Plot ==
Gladius features two separate storylines, one each for the two available player characters; Valens and Ursula. Unlike in many games with multiple player characters, the two campaigns in Gladius do not present different perspectives on the same story. Although some of the plot points are the same in each storyline, they are, in fact, two entirely independent plots, the details of which do not coalesce. (Note: For example, in Valens's story, Usus fought alongside Valens's father in the Great War, but in Ursula's story, he is an old friend of her father. Similarly, in Valens's story, he meets Ursula when he stumbles upon her being attacked in Nordagh, whereas in Ursula's story, she meets him outside an arena in Imperia.)

=== Background ===
The game takes place in the fictional lands of Gladius where, decades earlier, only the barbarians of Nordagh stood against the marauding Empire of Imperia. The ensuing conflict, known as the Great War, was vicious and bitter, and although it quickly reached a military stalemate, the slaughter senselessly continued. So pronounced was the violence that it led to the rebirth of the Dark God, Mortuus, a dragon-like entity who began to lay waste to both armies. In response, the benevolent Affinity Gods lent their strength to Galltyr, Queen of the Valkyrie, and with her Warriors of Light, she attacked Mortuus. Although the Valkyrie were all but wiped out, they succeeded in defeating him.

The few human survivors vowed never to allow something like this to happen again, and Imperia withdrew from Nordagh, with a temple built over the body of Mortuus, sealing in his evil. The two kingdoms then negotiated a return of the non-lethal gladiator games of old, hoping that this would be where society's lust for violence could be channeled. Schools of gladiators from all over Gladius were soon vying to win regional tournaments in the hope of competing in the High Tournament in Imperia.

=== Valens ===
As the game begins, Valens and his father, Munio (regarded as the greatest living gladiator), are returning from the amphitheatre when they are attacked by a group of men. Munio is killed, but Valens survives. Several weeks later, Valens takes over Munio's gladiatorial school, joined by his closest friend, Ludo, whom Munio had raised alongside Valens after the death of Ludo's father. Valens is also accompanied by Munio's most trusted advisor, Usus, who gives Valens Munio's amulet, telling him it is a symbol of Munio's love for the games.

Upon winning their first battle, Valens and Ludo are approached by two Channelers of the High Sept, who speak of their respect for Munio. As they depart, one notes, "he was wearing the amulet. I hope he understands the responsibility that comes with it." Shortly thereafter, they encounter the belligerent Imperial general, Mutuus. He offers Valens and Ludo a place in his school, but they reject him, with Usus explaining that he fought alongside Mutuus in the Great War, but after the defeat of Mortuus, Mutuus wanted Imperia to attack the weakened Nordagh, but Munio refused.

Upon winning the Imperial regional championship, the school heads to Roanor in Nordagh, the location of Mortuus's body, where they learn the temple has been broken into and Mortuus's heart stolen. They then encounter Ursula and Urlan, children of Nordagh's King Orin II. Helping the siblings escape an ambush, Ursula invites them to meet Orin. In Orin's court, Valens suggests that Ursula and Urlan join the school, and Orin agrees, much to Ursula's delight, and Ludo's chagrin. Thereafter, Ludo starts to become increasingly xenophobic, resentful of any non-Imperials who join the school.

Eventually, the increasingly antagonistic Ludo leaves the school, accusing Valens of lacking ambition and disgracing Munio's legacy. Meanwhile, the heart of the Dark God is brought by the thieves, led by Mutuus, to the summoner Nyphelia, who imbues Mutuus and his men with the power of darkness, creating the Dark Legion.

Having won all of the regional championships, the school competes in the High Tournament, emerging victorious. However, upon their victory, a massive stone gladiator statue comes alive, killing the Emperor. The gladiators and spectators flee, all except Mutuus, who slays the giant. Hailing him as a hero and calling for him to lead them, the people are unaware this is part of Nyphelia's plan to resurrect Mortuus. Valens and his school head to the High Sept for advice. There, they learn that Munio was chosen to be humanity's champion should Mortuus ever be reborn. That responsibility has now fallen to Valens. However, he cannot stand alone. The only way to defeat Mortuus is for Valens to combine his powers with those of Ursula, with whom he has fallen in love, and who is revealed to be a descendant of the Valkyrie.

As the Dark Legion march north, laying waste to everything in their path, the school confronts Mutuus. Bragging that it was he who killed Munio, they incapacitate him, but Nyphelia appears and kills him. Mortuus is then reborn from Mutuus's body. The school battles the dragon, with Ursula sacrificing herself to strike a mortal blow. A smiling Nyphelia then disappears from the battlefield as Ursula's spirit floats into the air. Before she leaves, she bids farewell to Valens, who tearfully tells her he loves her.

In an undisclosed location, Nyphelia receives a report telling her that despite the setback in Roanor, Nordagh has fallen, and "soon all nations shall tremble as our army marches across the land." Nyphelia then imbues one of her legionnaires with the same power of darkness she used on Mutuus. That legionnaire is Ludo.

=== Ursula ===
In Nordagh, twenty years before the game begins, the Galdr witches, prophesize that Mortuus will return with the aid of a young girl. They come to believe this girl is King Orin II's unborn child. When Orin's wife gives birth to a boy, it seemingly disproves the Galdr, but she then secretly gives birth to a girl. Orin hides the children (Urlan and Ursula), and they grow up in seclusion, with the Galdr unaware of them. Urlan grows to become an accomplished gladiator, whilst Ursula yearns to explore. As he prepares to lead a school to the regional games, he agrees that if she can beat him in combat, she can accompany him. She does so, but only after using a magical ability, the origin of which is a mystery to both her family and herself.

Joined by Orin's most trusted advisor, Usus, the school begins competing. Upon winning their first tournament, they head to Roanor, location of Mortuus's body, where they learn the temple has been broken into and Mortuus's heart stolen. Continuing to win tournaments, they then travel to Imperia, where they encounter the belligerent general, Mutuus. Usus explains that he fought alongside Mutuus in the Great War, but after the defeat of Mortuus, Mutuus wanted Imperia to attack the weakened Nordagh, but the Emperor refused. Meanwhile, Ursula encounters a young man from Imperia called Valens. He inherited his father's school, but it has fallen apart, with even his childhood friend, Ludo, abandoning him. Shortly thereafter, Valens joins Urlan's school.

Meanwhile, the heart of the Dark God is brought by the thieves, led by Mutuus, to the summoner Nyphelia, who imbues Mutuus and his men with the power of darkness, creating the Dark Legion. Having won all of the regional championships, the school competes in the High Tournament, emerging victorious. However, upon their victory, a massive stone gladiator statue comes alive, killing the Emperor. The gladiators and spectators flee, all except Mutuus, who slays the giant. Hailing him as a hero and calling for him to lead them, the people are unaware this is part of Nyphelia's plan to resurrect Mortuus. Ursula and the school head to Nordagh to warn Orin.

As the Dark Legion march north, laying waste to everything in their path, Nyphelia mortally wounds Orin. When Ursula and the others arrive, Nyphelia says they can do nothing to stop Mortuus's rebirth. With his dying words, Orin tells Ursula about the Galdr prophecy, urging her to seek their advice. They meet with the High Priestess, who states, "sisters, we have read the prophecy wrong; she does not only bring about the coming darkness. She is also the one to stop it." She then tells Ursula, "you are the last of the Valkyrie, the last spark of the light affinity in this world, the only one who can keep us from plunging into total darkness."

At Roanor, they confront Mutuus. They incapacitate him, but Nyphelia appears and kills him. Mortuus is then reborn from Mutuus's body. The school battles the dragon, with Ursula sacrificing herself to strike a mortal blow. A smiling Nyphelia then disappears from the battlefield as Ursula's spirit floats into the air. Before she leaves, she bids farewell to Valens, who tearfully tells her he loves her.

In an undisclosed location, Nyphelia receives a report telling her that despite the setback in Roanor, Nordagh has fallen, and "soon all nations shall tremble as our army marches across the land." Nyphelia then imbues one of her legionnaires with the same power of darkness she used on Mutuus. That legionnaire is Valens's childhood friend, Ludo.

== Development ==
Gladius was first announced in May 2002, slated for a Spring 2003 release. At this point, the game had already been in development for 18 months. The press release emphasised the two storylines, the mixture of single-player and multiplayer modes, and the core game mechanic of building up and managing a gladiatorial school. LucasArts estimated that it would take around 72 hours to complete both storylines, emphasising the size of the game's four distinct regions. They also cited the game's 16 character classes, 100+ character types, 200+ skills, and 400+ pieces of equipment. According to Sam Saliba, product marketing manager for LucasArts;

Gladius takes action RPGs to a whole new level. Besides signaling LucasArts' return to original game development, Gladius features a distinct style of play that is wrapped in an epic storyline. Players will experience a game that has incredible depth in terms of character development, but also has a unique layer of strategy related to how players manage and balance their team.

The game was first shown at E3 2002, with a playable demo of a 40% complete build of the Xbox version.

Speaking to GameSpot in September 2002, the game's director and co-writer, Robert Blackadder, explained why LucasArts had decided to make a gladiatorial game; "as a company we are trying to build our own brands outside of the standard licensed material. The high concept of Gladius struck a chord with people, and we've been running with it ever since." In terms of influence, Blackadder cited Final Fantasy Tactics, Vagrant Story, Madden NFL 2002, Mario Party, and "lots of RPGs."

Originally, the concept for the game had been much smaller than it ultimately became. As the world of the game continued to expand, the developers decided to create a second player character and split the story between them. The designers also elected to try to introduce "a new twist in the RPG genre", thus pushing the concept even further. According to Q&A lead, Chuck McFadden, the team constantly sought to push things; "[we] wanted to take this game genre farther than anyone else has. Is one console enough? Not a chance! Put this game on all three next-gen consoles at the same time! Is one main hero enough? Nope. We'll have two! Is one land in peril enough? Heck no! We'll have no less than four! Is 600 battles too many?" The game's world, weaponry, and human character classes are based on the real world of the 3rd to 6th centuries, with the base classes being Secutors, Samnites, Legionnaires and Peltasts. The game also features fantastical elements, such as gods and magic, and additional non-human classes such as Valkyrie, yetis, undead, satyrs, cyclopes, ogres, and minotaurs.

The game's engine was developed in-house by LucasArts and was built with the foreknowledge that the game would be released on multiple platforms. To that end, there were individual programmers working specifically on each version with their primary role being to ensure that the game takes advantage of each platform's architecture, all while maintaining a constant 60-frames-per-second frame rate across all three consoles. According to Blackadder, "we have a separate programmer heading platform-specific work. We are looking at taking advantage of different material modes and lighting effects available to each [platform]." In terms of the game being multi-platform, he said, "I see it as standard procedure going forward. For me it's meant focusing more on the game and not what machine it will be on."

== Reception ==
Reception

Aggregate score
Aggregator	Score		
Aggregator	GameCube	PS2	Xbox
Metacritic	82/100	78/100	79/100

Review scores
Publication	Score		
Publication	GameCube	PS2	Xbox
Electronic Gaming Monthly	7.2/10		
Game Informer	9/10	9/10	9.3/10
GameSpot	8.4/10	8.4/10	8.4/10
GameSpy	4.5/5	4.5/5	4.5/5
IGN	8.1/10	8/10	8.3/10
Nintendo Power	4.5/5		
Official U.S. PlayStation Magazine		4/5	
Official Xbox Magazine (US)			8.5/10
PlayStation: The Official Magazine		8/10	

Gladius received "generally favorable reviews" across all three platforms; the PlayStation 2 version holds an aggregate score of 78 out of 100 on Metacritic, based on 27 reviews; the Xbox version holds a score of 79 out of 100 from 31 reviews; and the GameCube version holds a score of 82 out of 100 from 13 reviews.

Game Informer's Matthew Kato scored the GameCube version 9 out of 10 and was especially impressed with the depth of the combat mechanics, particularly lauding the implementation of the hit meters. He concluded, "Gladius is the convergence of a lot of successful elements working in tandem." Also writing for Game Informer, Andrew Reiner scored the PlayStation 2 version 9 out of 10, calling it "a compelling and ingenious romp." He especially praised the use of hit meters and the depth of character customisation, concluding, "it has all of the makings of a bona fide classic." Jeremy Zoss scored the Xbox version 9.3 out of 10, also praising the range of customisation, the depth of the combat mechanics, and, especially, the hit meters.

GameSpy's Zach Meston scored all three versions 4.5 out of 5, calling it one of LucasArts' best games, and praising the developers "for having [...] the skill to deliver a game that competes with the best in the genre." Although he found the pace "sluggish", and the graphics under-par, he praised the simplicity of the gameplay, the implementation of hit meters, and the depth of customisation, calling it "one of the deepest games of the year." Nintendo Power scored the GameCube version an average of 4.3 out of 5. Steven Grimm scored it 4.5 out of 5, calling it "a must-own." Scott Pelland scored it 4, finding it to be "an excellent strategy RPG." George Sinfield scored it 4.5, calling it "an involving experience." Alan Averill, scored it 4, seeing it as "an ambitious title that ultimately falls victim to repetitiveness."

GameSpot's Greg Kasavin scored all three versions 8.4 out of 10, writing "Gladius [is] not just a great game but, in certain ways, a pioneering one." He praised the depth of combat, the range of equipment, the use of affinity points, and, especially, the hit meters. On the other hand, he found the story insubstantial. He concluded, "at the heart of this game is an interesting and well-thought-out combat system." IGN's Mary Jane Irwin scored the PlayStation 2 version 8 out of 10, the GameCube version 8.1 out of 10, and the Xbox version 8.3 out of 10, citing "an odd clashing of ideas that works surprisingly well." She was impressed with the hit meters, but she found the AI "unbalanced", and was critical of the story. Whilst she praised the graphics in the cutscenes ("facial animations are simply amazing"), she was critical of the in-game graphics ("hands and feet are blocky and claw looking, and clothes and skin textures aren't clearly defined"). She concluded, "Gladius [...] has plucked elements from several strategy games and patched them together into something that feels fresh."

Official U.S. PlayStation Magazine's Chris Baker scored the PlayStation 2 version 4 out of 5, praising the range of moves, the locations, the hit meters, and "the sheer depth of the game." Writing for PlayStation: The Official Magazine, Ryan McCaffrey scored it 8 out of 10. He was critical of the plot and some of the graphics, but felt "there's a lot to love", arguing "its shortcomings are minor [and] weaknesses are swept away by the sheer size and depth." Electronic Gaming Monthly scored the GameCube version an average of 7.2 out of 10. Joe Fielder scored it 6 out of 10, praising the characters and storyline, but was critical of the pacing; "if the number of battles were cut by at least a third and its combat speed doubled, the game could be on track for star status." Greg Stewart, on the other hand, scored it 8.5, praising the combat mechanics and depth of customisation. Greg Orlando scored it 8, criticising it for being too long, but praising the customisation and range of weaponry.

In 2007, Official Xbox Magazine included the game in their "best Xbox games most people never played" list.
