= Samnite =

Samnite is an adjective meaning "having to do with ancient Samnium."

Samnite may also refer to:

- Samnites, the people of ancient Samnium
- Samnite (gladiator type), a gladiator who fought with the equipment and in the manner of a Samnite soldier
- Samnite Wars, wars between the Roman Republic and the Samnites

== See also ==
- Samnis (disambiguation)
