= Cast net =

Type of fishing net

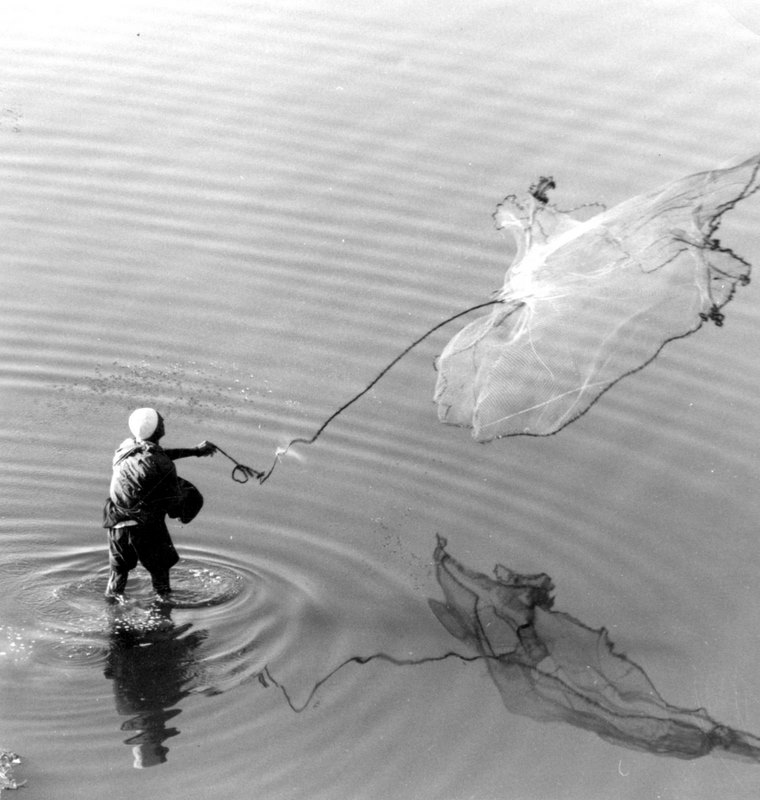
Casting the Net, by pioneering Iraqi photographer Murad al-Daghistani, 1930s

A cast net, also called a throw net, is a net used for fishing. It is a circular net with small weights distributed around its edge.

The net is cast or thrown by hand in such a manner that it spreads out while it's in the air before it sinks into the water. This technique is called net casting or net throwing. Fish are caught as the net is hauled back in. This simple device is particularly effective for catching small bait or forage fish, and has been in use, with various modifications, for thousands of years. - Net throwing or fishing is also used in modern drone techniques.

== Construction and technique ==
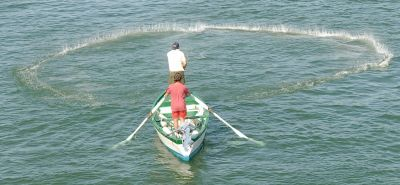
The net as it falls into the water

A man casting a net from the shore in Japan

Contemporary cast nets have a radius which ranges from 4 to 12 feet (1.2 to 3.6 metres). Standard nets for recreational fishing have a four-foot hoop. Weights are usually distributed around the edge at about one pound per foot (1.5 kilograms per metre). Attached to the net is a handline, one end of which is held in the hand as the net is thrown. When the net is full, a retrieval clamp, which works like a wringer on a mop, closes the net around the fish. The caster then retrieves the net by pulling on this handline. The net is lifted into a bucket and the clamp is released, dumping the caught fish into the bucket.

Cast nets work best in water no deeper than their radius. Casting is best done in waters free of obstructions. Reeds cause tangles and branches can rip nets. The net caster may choose to stand with one hand holding the handline, and with the net draped over the other arm so that the weights dangle, or with most of the net being held in one hand and only a part of the lead line held in the other hand so the weights dangle in a staggered fashion (approximately half of the weights in the throwing hand being held higher than the rest). The line is then thrown out to the water with both hands, in a circular motion rather as in hammer throwing. The net can be cast from a boat, the shore, or shallow water waded into.

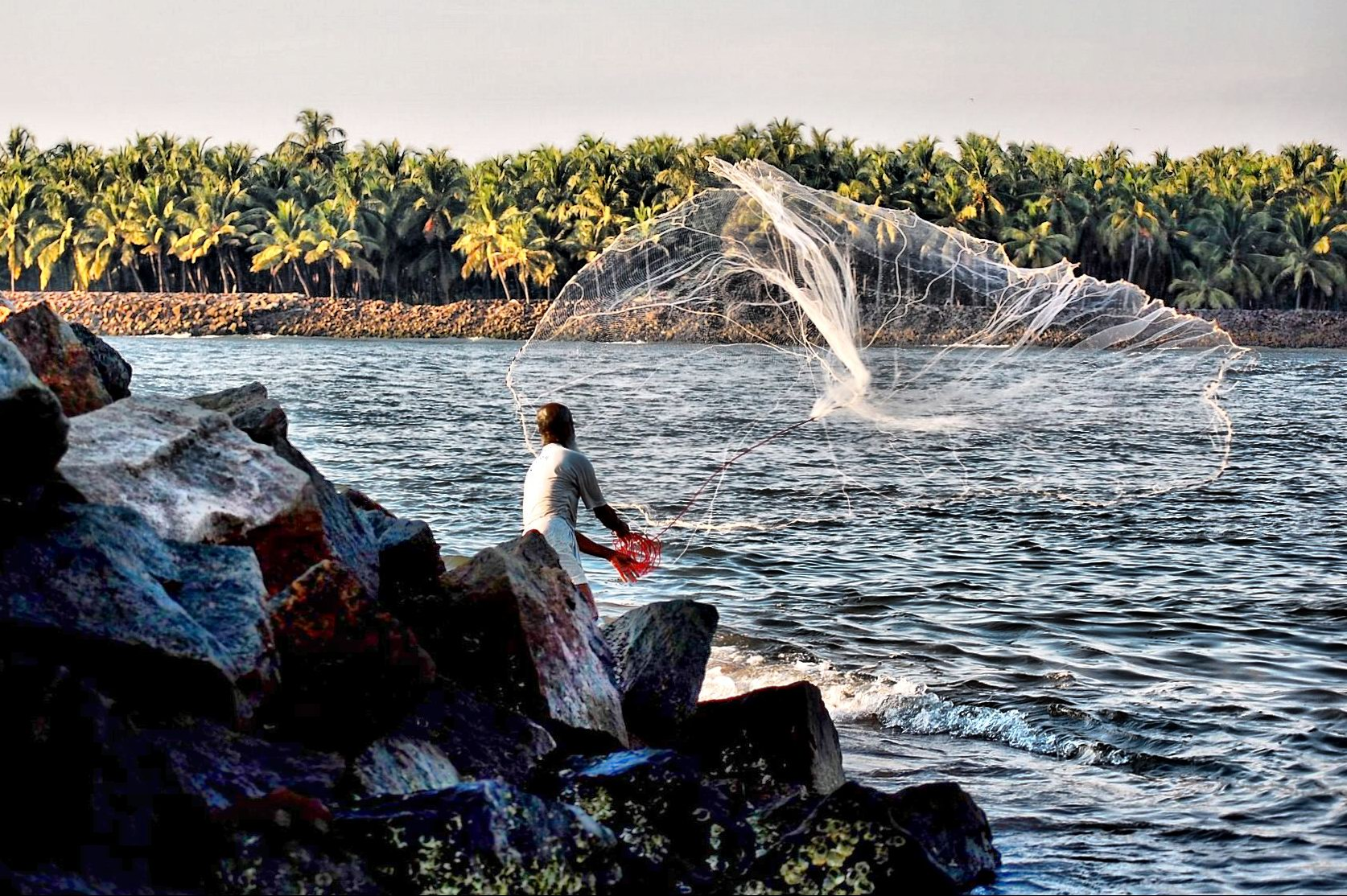
Fisherman casting from rocks

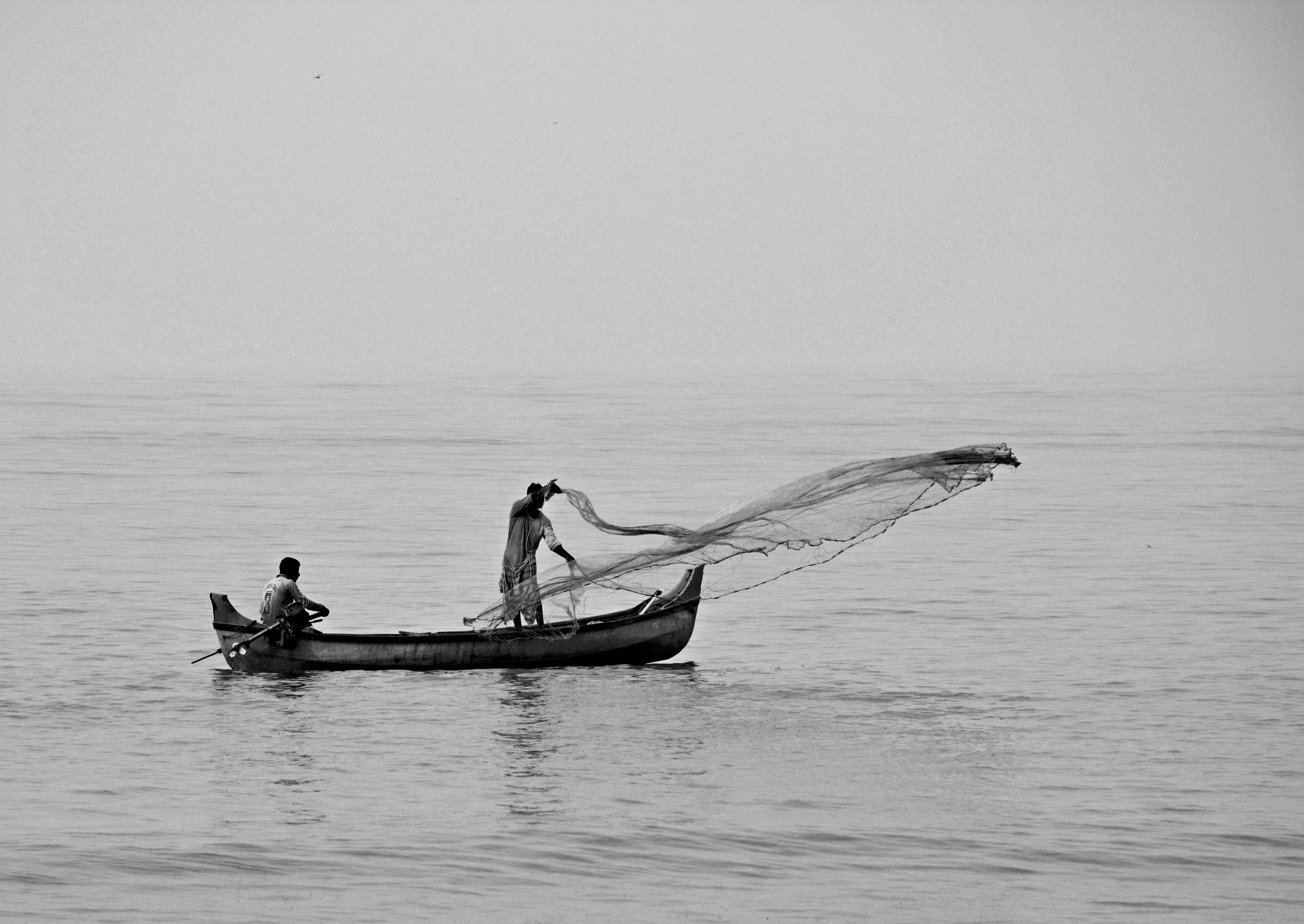
From a boat in India

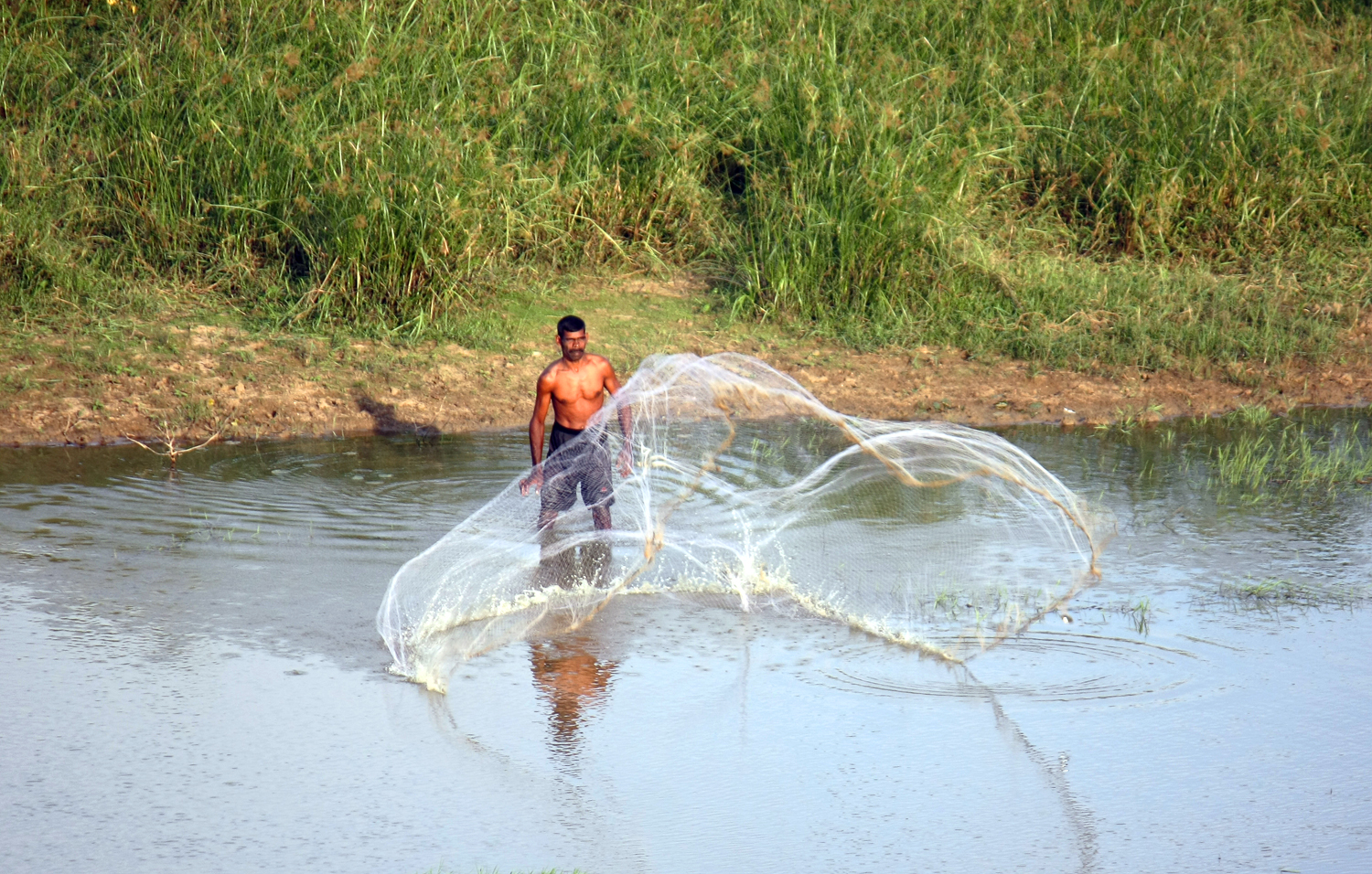
In a pond in Sri Lanka

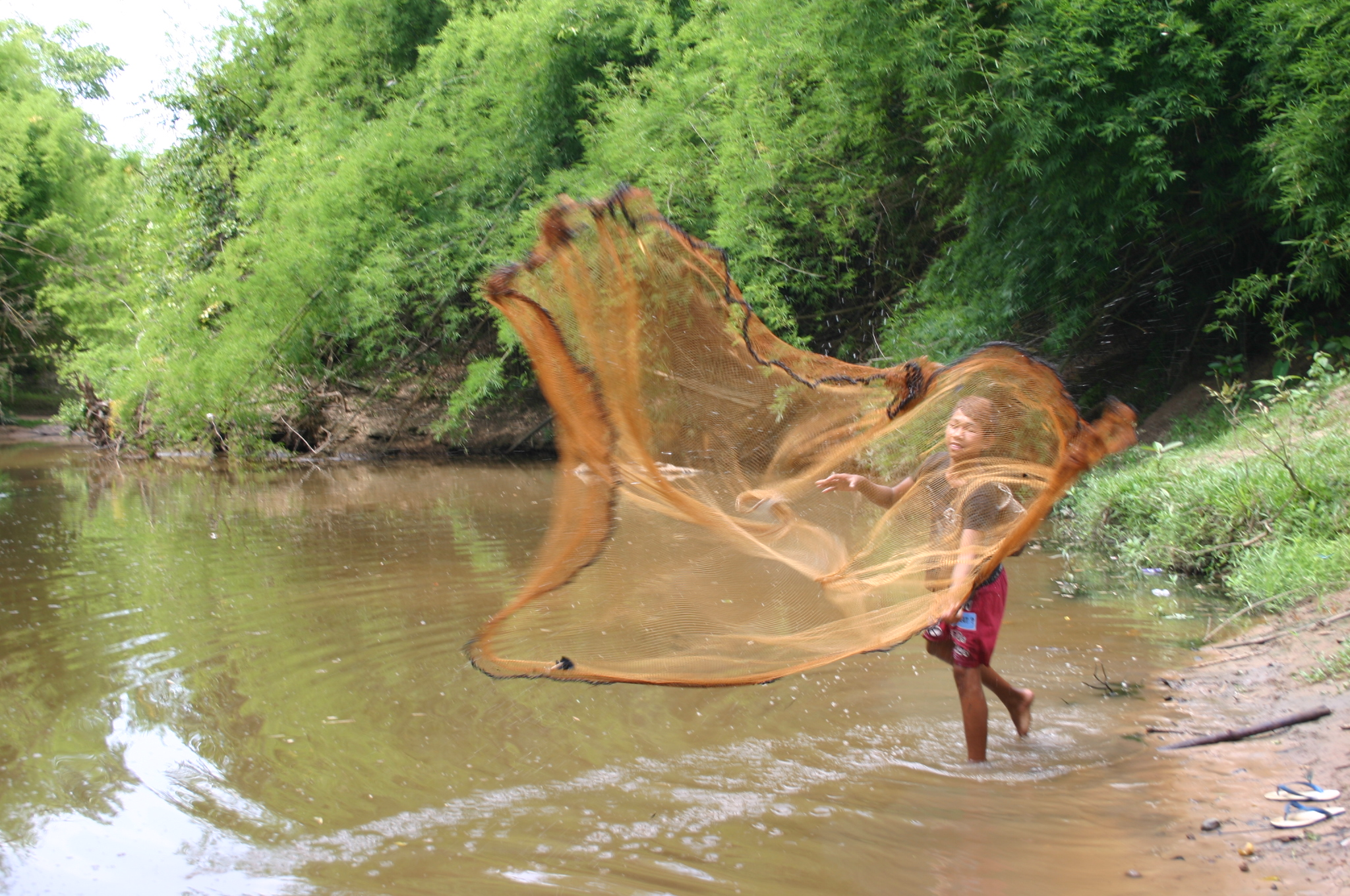
Boy casting from a riverbank

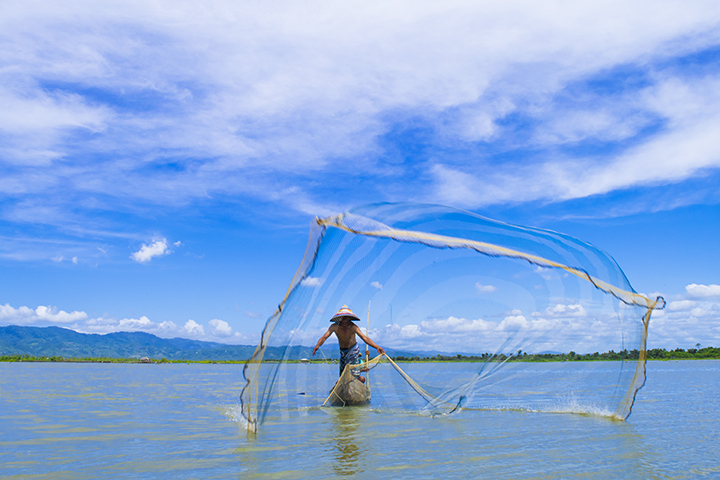
On a lake in Indonesia

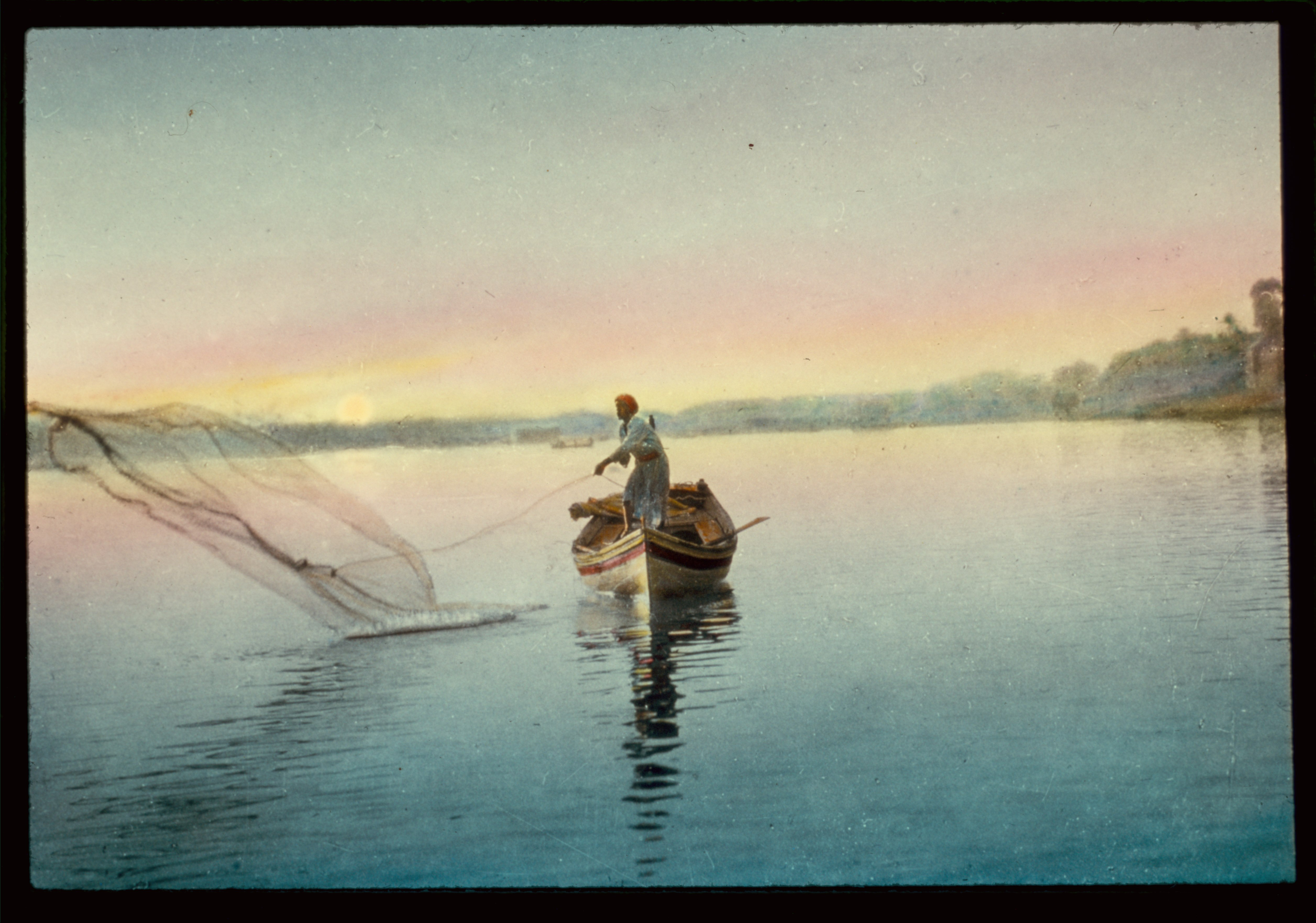
Throwing a net on the Euphrates

There are also optional net throwers that can make casting easier. These look like a lid from a trash can, including the handle on top. The outside circumference has a deep gutter. The net is loaded along the gutter and the weights are placed inside the gutter. The net is then tossed into the water using the thrower.

== Regulations and guidelines ==
The use of a cast net may be restricted in some areas when stated by use of sign or authorities. Some government entities in states like Florida state that most shrimp and fish under 8 inches can be caught using, “Cast nets having a stretched mesh size not greater than 1 inch in fresh waters of the state unless specifically prohibited.”. While in a state such as Illinois the law “Provides that all casting nets shall be legal, without size limits, for the capture of shad, minnow,” and many other bait fish. Along with this, different states may also require a fishing license to cast net in waters. In some states, such as Texas, "it is legal only for non-game fish" and there are also regulations in place to protect endangered species. If the guidelines outlined by the states and localities are disobeyed, fines and penalties can be brought against the individual who broke the rules. An example of this being that, "The use of cast net or throw net in any other Commonwealth waters is a violation of the Fish and Boat Code and is punishable by a fine and may result in the loss of fishing privileges"

== Biology ==
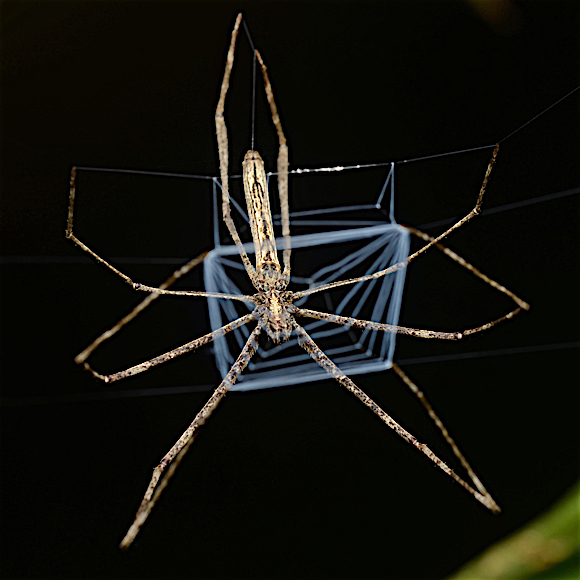
Net-casting spider

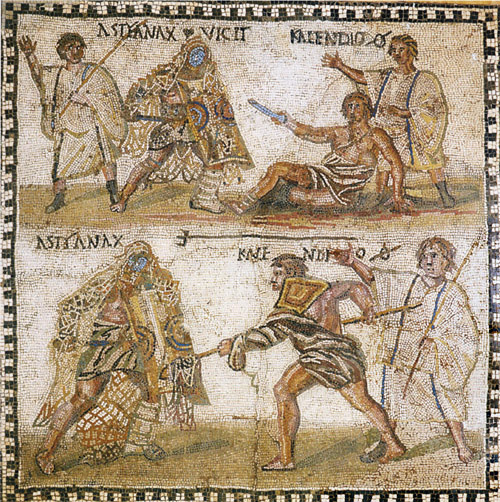
4th century BC mosaic showing a retiarius or "net fighter" with a trident and cast net, fighting a secutor

Net-casting spiders (or retiarius spiders) are stick-like spiders that build webs suspended between their front legs. When prey approaches, the spider stretches its net till it is much larger, and then propels itself onto its prey, entangling it in the web.

== History ==
In ancient Rome, in a parody of fishing, a type of gladiator called a retiarius or "net fighter" was armed with a trident and a cast net. The retiarius was traditionally pitted against a secutor.

Between 177 and 180 the Greek author Oppian wrote the Halieutica, a didactic poem about fishing. He described various means of fishing including the use of nets cast from boats.

In Norse mythology the sea giantess Rán cast a fishing net to trap lost sailors.

There is a reference in the New Testament to cast netting. Per John 21:6: "He said, “Throw your net on the right side of the boat and you will find some.” When they did, they were unable to haul the net in because of the large number of fish."

== See also ==
- Hand net – Type of fishing net
- Shrimp baiting – Shrimp catching method
