= Shrimp baiting =

Shrimp catching method

Shrimp baiting is a method used by recreational fisherman for of catching shrimp. In the 1980s the sport became popular in the southeastern coastal states of North Carolina, South Carolina, Georgia, and Florida. Since then, several local state regulations have been implemented to better regulate catch limits, methods, and seasons.

== The technique ==
Shrimp baiting uses a cast net, bait and long poles. The long poles are used to mark a specific location, and then bait is thrown in the water near the pole. After several minutes the cast net is thrown as close to the bait as possible and the shrimp are caught in the net.

The bait balls can be made of just about anything a shrimp will eat. The most common bait is a mixture of powdered clay and fish meal (typically ground menhaden). Other popular baits are flour, corn meal, cat food, and chicken feed. The bait typically includes a binding agent such as clay or Portland cement. The balls range in size from a tennis ball to a softball and are typically flattened out to a hamburger shape.

In addition to "running the poles" from a boat, some people bait from the shore or docks. A permit is required for this, along with the landowners permission. Some people will place a single pole in front of the boat and use three anchors in a Y pattern to hold the boat still. Then they throw the bait out around the boat. Shrimpers have also begun using an auger type pole to hold the boat in a fixed point, and then use their trolling motor to rotate around this fixed point, allowing them to bait in a 360 degree arc the radius of the boat. This technique can be highly effective.

== Regulations ==
In South Carolina, a shrimp baiting permit provides the fisher with ten tags. A tag must be placed on each of up to ten poles. The poles, used to mark the bait location, must be one inch in diameter or less and have reflective tape. The typical setup is to place ten poles in a single row and then drive a boat beside the poles and drop bait balls 6 to 10 feet from each pole. The shrimp will find the bait and begin feeding as the tide carries the bait to them.
