= Samnis =

Samnis or Samnes may refer to:

- An inhabitant of Samnium, a region of southern Italy conquered by Rome in the 4th century BC
- Samnite (gladiator type), a class of gladiator from the Roman Republican period

== See also ==
- Samnite (disambiguation)
