= Retiarius =

Type of Ancient Roman gladiator

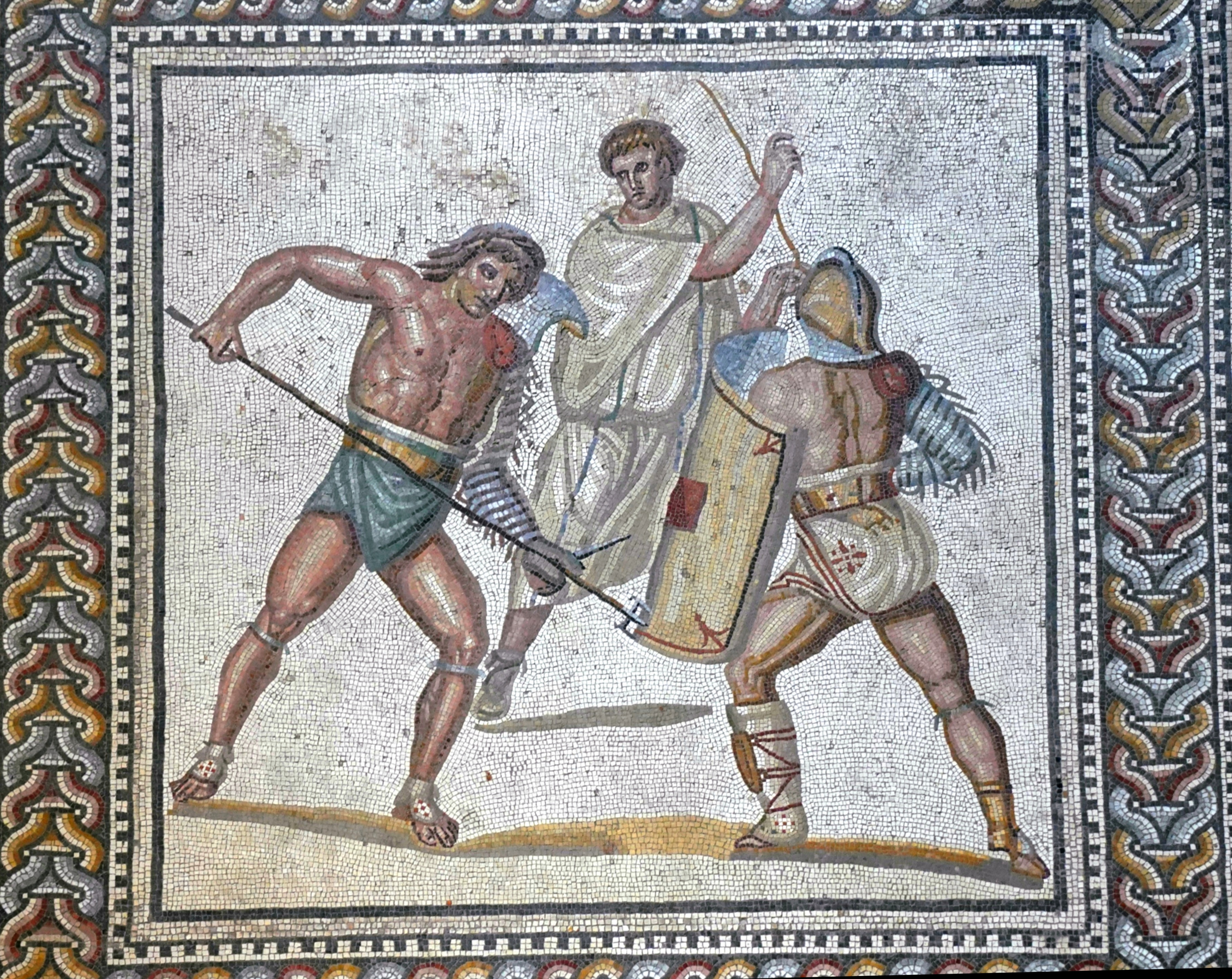
A retiarius stabs at a secutor with his trident in this mosaic from the villa at Nennig, c. 2nd–3rd century CE.

A retiarius (plural retiarii; literally, "net-man" in Latin) was a Roman gladiator who fought with equipment styled on that of a fisherman: a weighted net (rete (3rd decl.), hence the name), a three-pointed trident (fuscina or tridens), and a dagger (pugio). The retiarius was lightly armoured, wearing an arm guard (manica) and a shoulder guard (galerus). Typically, his clothing consisted only of a loincloth (subligaculum) held in place by a wide belt, or of a short tunic with light padding. He wore no head protection or footwear.

The retiarius was routinely pitted against a heavily armed secutor. The net-fighter made up for his lack of protective gear by using his speed and agility to avoid his opponent's attacks and waiting for the opportunity to strike. He first tried to throw his net over his rival. If this succeeded, he attacked with his trident while his adversary was entangled. Another tactic was to ensnare his enemy's weapon in the net and pull it out of his grasp, leaving the opponent defenceless. Should the net miss or the secutor grab hold of it, the retiarius likely discarded the weapon, although he might try to collect it back for a second cast. Usually, the retiarius had to rely on his trident and dagger to finish the fight. The trident, as tall as a human being, permitted the gladiator to jab quickly, keep his distance, and easily cause bleeding. It was not a strong weapon, usually inflicting non-fatal wounds so that the fight could be prolonged for the sake of entertainment. The dagger was the retiarius's final backup should the trident be lost. It was reserved for when close combat or a straight wrestling match had to settle the bout. In some battles, a single retiarius faced two secutores simultaneously. For these situations, the lightly armoured gladiator was placed on a raised platform and given a supply of stones with which to repel his pursuers.

Retiarii first appeared in the arena during the 1st century AD and had become standard attractions by the 2nd or 3rd century. The gladiator's lack of armour and his reliance on evasive tactics meant that many considered the retiarius the lowliest (and most effeminate) of the gladiators, an already stigmatised class. Passages from the works of Juvenal, Seneca, and Suetonius suggest that those retiarii who fought in tunics may have constituted an even more demeaned subtype (retiarii tunicati) who were not viewed as legitimate retiarii fighters but as arena clowns. Nevertheless, Roman artwork, graffiti, and grave markers include examples of specific retiarii who were apparently reputed for their skill as both combatants and womanizers.

== History and role ==
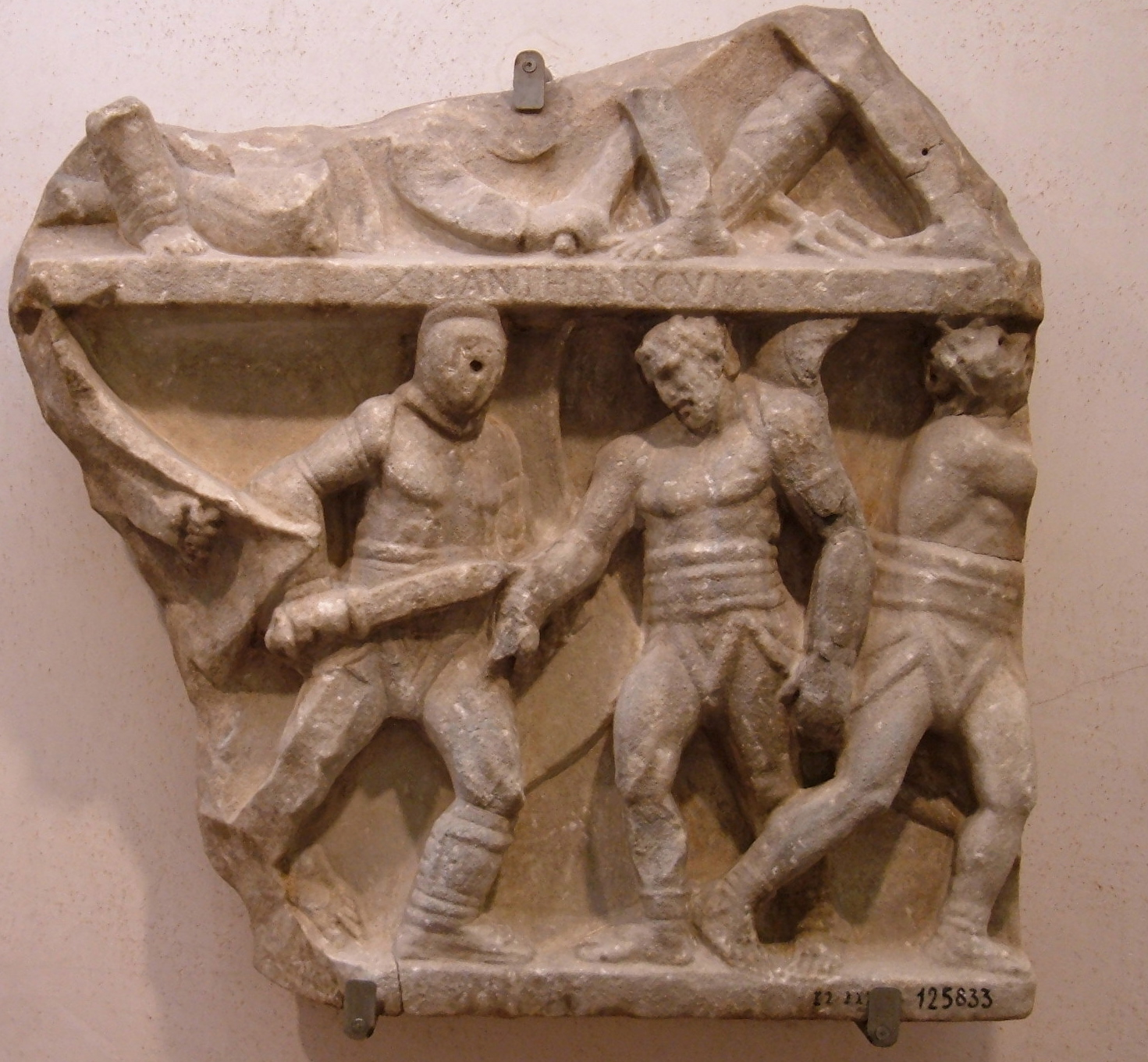
Relief showing a fight between a secutor and retiarius

Roman gladiators fell into stock categories modelled on real-world precedents. Almost all of these classes were based on military antecedents; the retiarius ("net-fighter" or "net-man"), who was themed after the sea, was one exception. Rare gladiator fights were staged over water; these may have given rise to the concept of a gladiator based on a fisherman. Fights between differently-armed gladiators became popular in the Imperial period; the retiarius versus the scaly secutor developed as the conflict of a fisherman with a stylised fish. The earlier murmillones had borne a fish on their helmets; the secutores with their scaly armour evolved from them. However, because of the stark differences in arms and armour between the two types, the pairing pushed such practices to new extremes. Roman art and literature make no mention of retiarii until the early Imperial period; for example, the type is absent from the copious gladiator-themed reliefs dating to the 1st century found at Chieti and Pompeii. Nevertheless, graffiti and artifacts from Pompeii attest to the class's existence by this time. Fights between retiarii and secutores probably became popular as early as the middle of the 1st century CE; the net-fighter had become one of the standard gladiator categories by the 2nd or 3rd century CE and remained a staple attraction until the end of the gladiatorial games. In addition to the man-versus-nature symbolism inherent in such bouts, the lightly armoured retiarius was viewed as the effeminate counterpoint to the manly, heavily armoured secutor. The retiarius was also seen as water to the secutor's fire, one constantly moving and escaping, the other determinedly inescapable. Another gladiator type, the laquearius ("noose-man"), was similar to the retiarius but fought with a lasso in place of a net.

The more skin left unarmoured and exposed, the lower a gladiator's status and the greater his perceived effeminacy. Likewise, the engulfing net may have been seen as a feminine symbol. The light arms and armour of the retiarius thus established him as the lowliest, most disgraced, and most effeminate of the gladiator types. Helmets allowed both gladiators and spectators to dehumanise the fighters; when an arena combatant had to kill a comrade-at-arms, someone he had probably lived and trained with every day, his opponent's helmet added an extra layer of separation. However, the retiarius was allowed no head protection; his face was visible to all. The emperor Claudius had all net-fighters who lost in combat put to death so that spectators could enjoy their expressions of agony. The retiarius's fighting style was another strike against him, as reliance on speed and evasion were viewed as undignified in comparison to the straightforward trading of blows. The retiarii lived in the worst barracks. Some members of the class trained to fight as Samnites, another gladiator type, in order to improve their status.

There is evidence that those net-men wearing tunics, known as retiarii tunicati, formed a special sub-class, one even more demeaned than their loincloth-wearing colleagues. The Roman satirist Juvenal wrote that:

So even the lanista's establishment is better ordered than yours, for he separates the vile from the decent, and sequesters even from their fellow-retiarii the wearers of the ill-famed tunic; in the training-school, and even in gaol, such creatures herd apart….

The passage suggests that tunic-wearing retiarii were trained for a different role, "in servitude, under strict discipline and even possibly under some restraints." Certain effeminate men mentioned by Seneca the Younger in his Quaestiones naturales were trained as gladiators and may correspond to Juvenal's tunic-wearing retiarii. Suetonius reports this anecdote: "Once a band of five retiarii in tunics, matched against the same number of secutores, yielded without a struggle; but when their death was ordered, one of them caught up his trident and slew all the victors." The reaction of Emperor Caligula showed the disgust with which he viewed the gladiators' actions: "Caligula bewailed this in a public proclamation as a most cruel murder, and expressed his horror of those who had had the heart to witness it." The fate of the retiarii is not revealed. This was probably not a standard competition, as real gladiators did not surrender so easily. Rather, such tunic-wearing net-men may have served as comic relief in the gladiatorial programming.

Juvenal's second satire, wherein he deplores the immorality he perceived in Roman society, introduces a member of the Gracchus family who is described as a homosexual married (in female persona) to a horn player. Gracchus later appears in the arena:

Greater still the portent when Gracchus, clad in a tunic, played the gladiator, and fled, trident in hand, across the arena—Gracchus, a man of nobler birth than the Capitolini, or the Marcelli, or the descendants of Catulus or Paulus, or the Fabii: nobler than all the spectators in the podium; not excepting him who gave the show at which that net was flung.

Gracchus appears once again in Juvenal's eighth satire as the worst example of the noble Romans who have disgraced themselves by appearing in public spectacles and popular entertainments:

To crown all this [scandal], what is left but the amphitheatre? And this disgrace of the city you have as well—Gracchus not fighting as equipped as a Mirmillo, with buckler or falchion (for he condemns—yes, condemns and hates such equipment). Nor does he conceal his face beneath a helmet. See! he wields a trident. When he has cast without effect the nets suspended from his poised right hand, he boldly lifts his uncovered face to the spectators, and, easily to be recognized, flees across the whole arena. We can not mistake the tunic, since the ribbon of gold reaches from his neck, and flutters in the breeze from his high-peaked cap. Therefore, the disgrace, which the Secutor had to submit to, in being forced to fight with Gracchus, was worse than any wound.

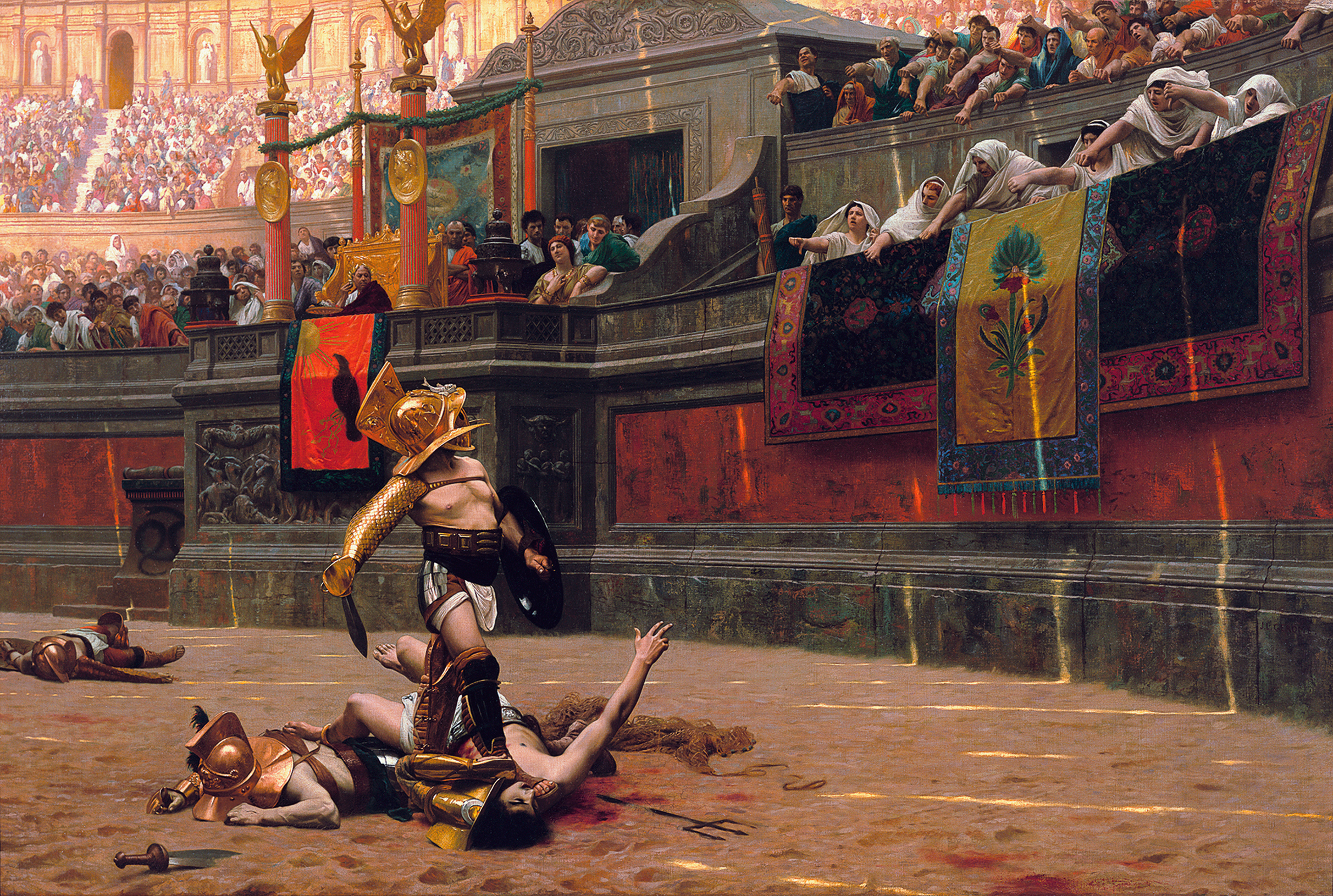
A murmillo stands victorious over a retiarius in Pollice Verso, a painting by Jean-Léon Gérôme (1872).

The passage is obscure, but Cerutti and Richardson argue that Gracchus begins the fight as a loincloth-wearing retiarius. When the tide turns against him, he dons a tunic and a womanish wig (spira), apparently part of the same costume, and thus enjoys a reprieve, although this attire may not itself have been considered effeminate as it was also worn by the priests of Mars of whom Gracchus was the chief priest. The change of clothing seems to turn a serious fight into a comical one and shames his opponent. It is unusual to see a gladiator depicted this way in a satire, as such fighters usually take the role of men who are "brawny, brutal, sexually successful with women of both high and low status, but especially the latter, ill-educated if not uneducated, and none too bright intellectually." The retiarius tunicatus in the satire is the opposite: "a mock gladiatorial figure, of equivocal sex, regularly dressed in costume of some sort, possibly usually as a woman, and matched against a secutor or murmillo in a mock gladiatorial exhibition."

Despite their low status, some retiarii became quite popular throughout the early Empire. The fact that spectators could see net-fighters' faces humanised them and probably added to their popularity. At Pompeii, graffiti tells of Crescens or Cresces the retiarius, "lord of the girls" and "doctor to nighttime girls, morning girls, and all the rest." Evidence suggests that some homosexual men fancied gladiators, and the retiarius would have been particularly appealing. Roman art depicts retiarii just as often as other types. A mosaic found in 2007 in a bathhouse at the Villa dei Quintili shows a retiarius named Montanus. The fact that his name is recorded indicates that the gladiator was famous. The mosaic dates to c. CE 130, when the Quintilii family had the home built; the emperor Commodus, who fought in gladiatorial bouts as a secutor, acquired the house in CE 182 and used it as a country villa. In modern times, popular culture has made the retiarius probably the most famous type of gladiator.

== Arms and armour ==
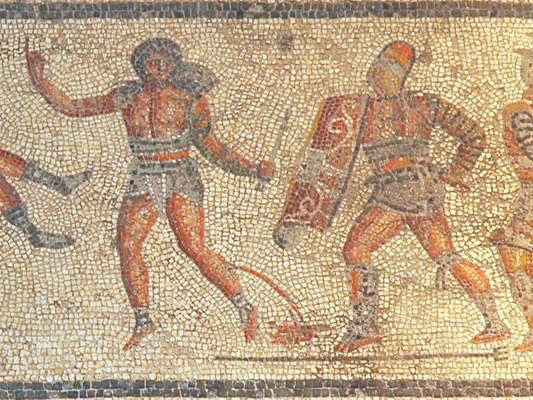
In this scene from the Zliten mosaic (c. CE 200), a retiarius armed only with a dagger raises a finger in surrender. His trident lies at the foot of his secutor adversary, and his net is missing. He is also seen bleeding from an artery in his leg

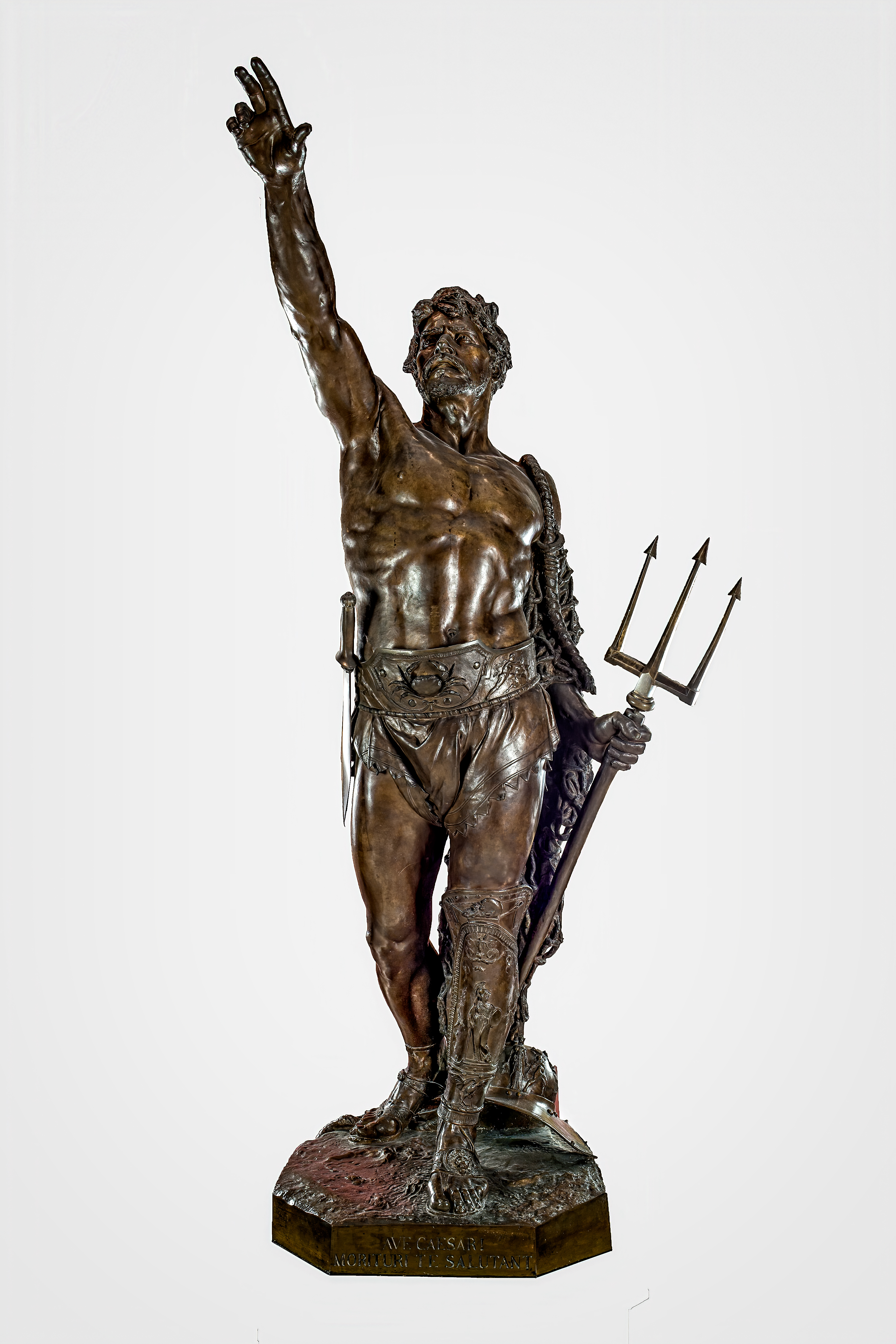
A retiarius depicted by Polish sculptor Pius Weloński at the National Museum, Kraków

The retiarius is the most readily identifiable gladiator type, due to his signature equipment: arm guard (manica), shoulder guard (galerus), net (rete), trident (fuscina or tridens), and dagger (pugio). (Technically, the retiarius was not a "gladiator" at all, since he did not fight with the sword—gladius—after which such fighters took their name.) His weapons and armour could be decorated. An embellished gladiatorial dagger is held at the Naples National Archaeological Museum. Archaeologists have excavated three engraved shoulder guards from the gladiator barracks at Pompeii: one is engraved with illustrations of an anchor, a crab, and a dolphin; another with cupids and the head of Hercules; and a third with weapons and the inscription RET/SECUND ("retiarius, second rank").

Although the net (rete) was this gladiator's signature weapon, few depictions of the device survive. Combat with throwing nets may have occurred on ancient battlefields, but modern experiments and comparisons with modern fishing nets offer the only clues as to how the gladiatorial net was constructed. Such data indicate that the rete was circular, with a wide mesh about 3 metres (9.8 feet) in diameter and lead weights along the edges. A rope ran around the perimeter of the mesh, with the ends tied to the gladiator's wrist. Because it was thrown, the net was sometimes called a iaculum.

The retiarius complemented his net with an iron or bronze trident (fuscina, fascina or, rarely, tridens) that stood about as high as a human being. A skull found in a gladiator graveyard in Ephesus, Turkey, shows puncture holes consistent with a trident strike. The wounds are 5 centimetres (2.0 inches) apart and match a bronze trident excavated from Ephesus harbour in 1989. The trident's prongs are 21.6 centimetres (8.5 inches) long.

A long, straight-bladed dagger (pugio) was the gladiator's final weapon. A tombstone found in Romania shows a retiarius holding a dagger with four spikes (known as a quadrens—each spike at the corner of a square guard) instead of the usual bladed dagger. This was previously thought to be an artistic invention or perhaps a ceremonial weapon but an excavated femur bone from a gladiator graveyard in Ephesus has wounds consistent with the use of such a weapon.

The retiarius wore minimal armour; unlike other gladiator types, he wore no helmet, greaves, or shield. He wore a manica on his left arm, where other gladiators wore it on the right; this allowed him to more fluidly make a right-handed cast of his net. Attached to the top of this was a long bronze or leather guard over the upper left arm and shoulder, known as a galerus. This guard extended 12 to 13 centimetres (4.7 to 5.1 inches) beyond the shoulder blade and flared outward, allowing free movement of the gladiator's head. The device protected the upper arm, head and face when the retiarius kept his left side to his opponent. The armour was designed to let the net-man duck his head behind it, and it was curved so as to deflect a blow from the top downwards, not up towards the eyes. Three examples of this protective gear found at Pompeii vary between 30 and 35 centimetres (12 and 14 inches) in length and about the same in width. They weigh about 1.1 to 1.2 kg (2.4 to 2.6 lb).

In the Eastern Roman Empire in later years, some retiarii wore a chainmail manica instead of the galerus. This mail covered the arm and upper chest. Equipment styles stayed relatively fixed in the Western Empire.

Besides these items, the retiarius wore only a loincloth (subligaculum) held in place by a wide belt and gaiters or, as images show in lieu of the loincloth, a tunic that left the right shoulder uncovered. He wore fabric padding on his body to provide minimal additional protection. Artistic depictions show that other options included legbands, anklebands, a headband, and a medallion. All told, the retiarius's equipment weighed 7 to 8 kilograms (15.4 to 17.6 lb), making him the lightest of the standard gladiator types. Like other arena combatants, the retiarius fought barefoot.

== Fighting style ==
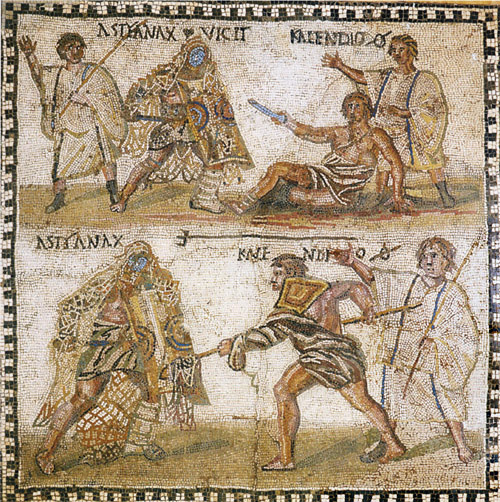
In the lower frame of this mosaic at the National Archaeological Museum in Madrid, the retiarius Kalendio captures the secutor Astyanax in his net. Nevertheless, in the upper image, Kalendio lies wounded on the ground and raises his dagger to surrender.

The retiarius was traditionally pitted against a secutor or, possibly on rare occasions, a murmillo. Despite the disparity between the nearly nude net-fighter and his heavily armoured adversary, modern re-enactments and experiments show that the retiarius was by no means outmatched. His lack of heavy equipment meant that he could use speed and evasion to his advantage. He also fought with three offensive weapons to his opponent's one. The net-fighter had to avoid close combat at all costs, keep his distance, and wait for an opening to stab with his trident or throw his net. The name secutor means "pursuer" or "chaser", because this gladiator had to chase down the retiarius. They were also known as contraretiarii ("those against the net-man"). The secutor's strategy was to keep behind his shield (scutum) and force his opponent into close combat so that he could strike with his sword. In close quarters, the net-man had only his galerus shoulder guard for defence; its design forced him to keep his head ducked down behind it. The secutor's helmet greatly restricted his sight, hearing, and airflow. Coupled with the heavy weight of his arms and armour—the gear of a murmillo, of which the secutor was a variant, weighed 15 to 18 kg (33 to 40 lb)—this gladiator was in greater danger of exhausting himself in a long fight. One of the retiarius's tactics was to jab at the secutor's shield (the heaviest part of his equipment), forcing him to block and wear himself out.

In skilled hands, the net was a useful weapon. The retiarius's primary objective with it was to capture his opponent. A ewer found at Rheinzabern demonstrates the throwing technique: the retiarius held the net folded up in his right hand and cast it underhanded. He held his trident and dagger in his left hand, careful to keep the trident's prongs pointed downward to avoid snagging it in the mesh. If the toss missed, the retiarius used the drawrope tied to his wrist to bring the net back in hand. On a successful cast, the gladiator tightened the drawcord around the net's perimeter and tried to unbalance or topple his rival. A successful cast of the net could win the battle for the retiarius straightaway. This was not certain, however, as a mosaic at the National Archaeological Museum in Madrid shows: in the first panel, the retiarius Kalendio has caught his opponent, a secutor named Astyanax, in his net. In the later image, however, Kalendio lies on the ground, wounded, and raises his dagger to surrender. The inscription above Kalendio shows the Greek capital theta (Θ, for thanatos, death), implying that the match organisers ordered him killed.

The net could ensnare the secutor's weapon to disarm him and snag away his shield to put him at a significant disadvantage. Other retiarius tricks were to whip the net at his opponent's eyes to blind him and at his legs to trip him. The helmet of the secutor was smooth and round to avoid snagging the net. In most cases, the secutor knew to expect the net-man's tactics and tried to intercept and hold on to the weapon, possibly unsteadying his enemy by yanking on the net. In such danger, the retiarius could sever the drawstring from his wrist with his dagger. The secutor stood by a lost net and left little chance to recover it. Speculation surrounds the frequency with which the retiarius used his net. Extant imagery rarely shows gladiators of the type with a net, yet the class is named for the device, and Juvenal uses the net to quickly identify a retiarius in his satires. The discrepancy may simply be a case of artistic licence; other types of gladiator are often shown without their weapons but can be assumed to be holding them due to their stance, and a net is a particularly difficult weapon to depict. The lack of nets in retiarius images may show gladiators who have already lost the weapon in the fight. Another possibility is that some retiarii simply did not use nets.

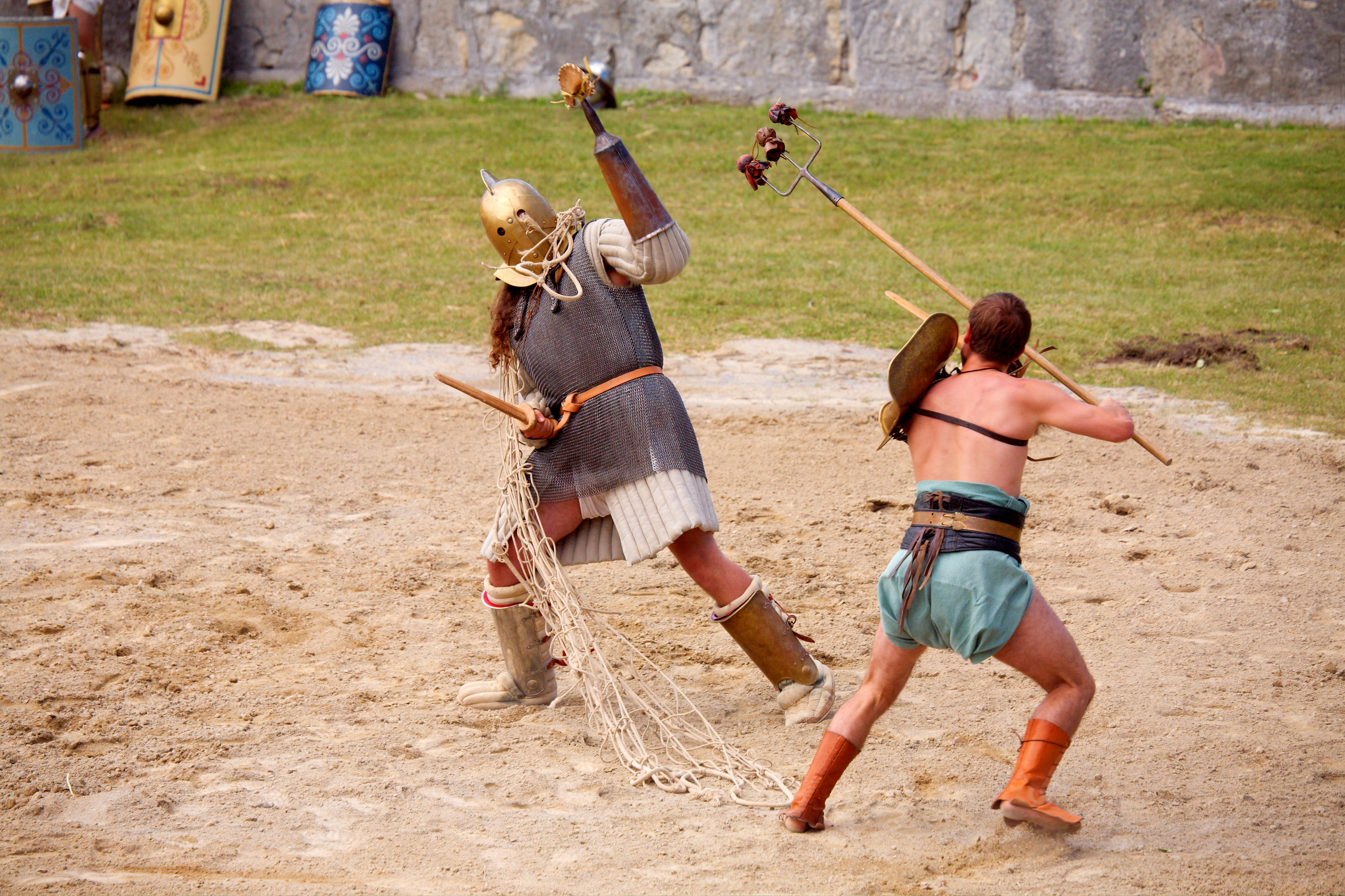
In this mock gladiatorial fight at Carnuntum, Austria, the scissor (left) is wearing a conical arm guard used to snag away the net of the retiarius (right).

In most bouts, the retiarius probably had to resort to fighting with just his trident and dagger, placing him at a disadvantage. The trident was his primary weapon in such situations, and its length allowed the retiarius to keep his opponent at bay. He held the weapon two-handed, left nearer the prongs, so that he could parry his enemy's strikes with its shaft and strike with both ends. Wielded two-handed, the weapon could land powerful blows. Images show retiarii stabbing downward at the secutor's unshielded legs or stabbing down at the helmet in an attempt to poke through an eyehole. The trident itself was too weak to pierce the metal, although a skull found at Ephesus, Turkey, dating to CE 200 to 300 shows that a trident strike to the head could be fatal on a bareheaded opponent. The secutor's helmet was rounded and free of protrusions to avoid snaring the net or being caught in the trident's prongs, but attacks on it forced the secutor to duck or hide behind his shield. This reduced his field of vision and gave the retiarius an advantage with his speed. Should the secutor strike with his sword, the retiarius parried with the trident prongs and attempted to disarm him. Likewise, the more heavily armoured gladiator tried to block the trident with his shield and force the net-man to lose it. Another type of gladiator, scissor could also be pitted against a retiarius. Images from the Eastern Roman Empire show scissores wearing a tubular arm-guard in lieu of a shield. The guard fits over the left hand and ends in a hooked, knife-like blade that was probably intended to parry the net and trident or to snag and pull away the net. Scissores who succeeded in this probably dropped the hook weapon and fought with just a sword.

The retiarius held the dagger in his left hand. The gladiator could use the dagger to cut his net free if it got snagged on his trident. He might fight with the trident in one hand and the dagger in the other, but this negated the advantage of distance afforded by the longer weapon when wielded by itself. The dagger also served as a backup should the retiarius lose both net and trident. He attacked with the dagger when he had the element of surprise and could attempt to wrestle the secutor to the ground. Fights could devolve into straight wrestling matches in such situations, perhaps with daggers. Should the retiarius win and be ordered to kill his rival, he used his knife to stab him or cut his throat. Evidence shows that retiarii could be quite successful combatants; a tombstone from Gaul reads, "[For] the retiarius, L. Pompeius, winner of nine crowns, born in Vienna, twenty-five years of age. His wife put this up with her own money for her wonderful spouse." Nevertheless, the gladiators themselves were prone to boast: A graffito at Pompeii shows the retiarius Antigonus, who claims a ridiculous 2,112 victories, facing a challenger called Superbus, who has won but a single fight.

In some contests, a retiarius faced two secutores at the same time. He stood on a bridge or raised platform with stairs and had a pile of fist-sized stones to lob at his adversaries and keep them at bay. The secutores tried to scale the structure and get at him. The platform (called a pons, "bridge") may have been constructed over water. Such scenarios were one of the rare situations where gladiators were not paired one on one.

== See also ==
- List of Roman gladiator types
