= Samneh, Hama =

Samneh سمنة
- Village
- Location in Syria
- Coordinates: 35.131577°N 37.083171°E
- Country: Syria
- Governorate: Hama
- District: Salamiyah District
- Subdistrict: Salamiyah Subdistrict

Population (2004)
  - Total: 392
- Time zone: UTC+3 (AST)
- City Qrya Pcode: C3227

Samneh (Arabic: سمنة) is a Syrian village located in Salamiyah Subdistrict in Salamiyah District, Hama Governorate. According to the Syria Central Bureau of Statistics (CBS), Samneh had a population of 392 in the 2004 census.
