= Thraex =

Type of Roman gladiator

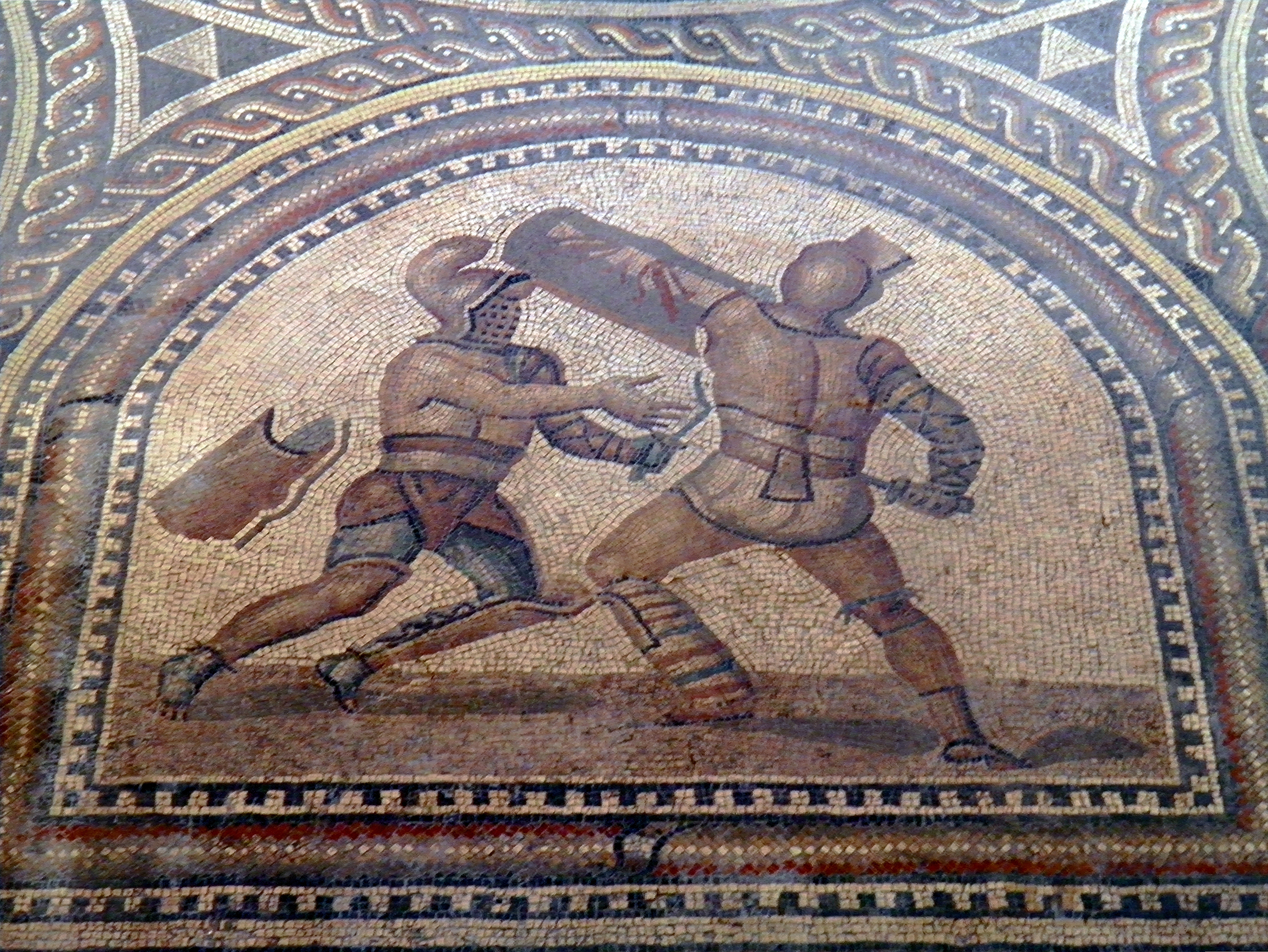
A Thraex (left) fighting a murmillo, mosaic from Bad Kreuznach, Germany

The Thraex (pl.: Thraeces), or Thracian, was a type of Roman gladiator armed in Thracian style. His equipment included a parmula, a small shield (about 60 × 65 cm) that might be rectangular, square or circular; and a sica, a short sword with a curved blade like a small version of the Dacian falx, intended to maim an opponent's unarmoured back. His other armour included greaves, a protective belt above a loincloth, and a helmet with a side plume, visor and high crest.

== Fighting style and techniques ==
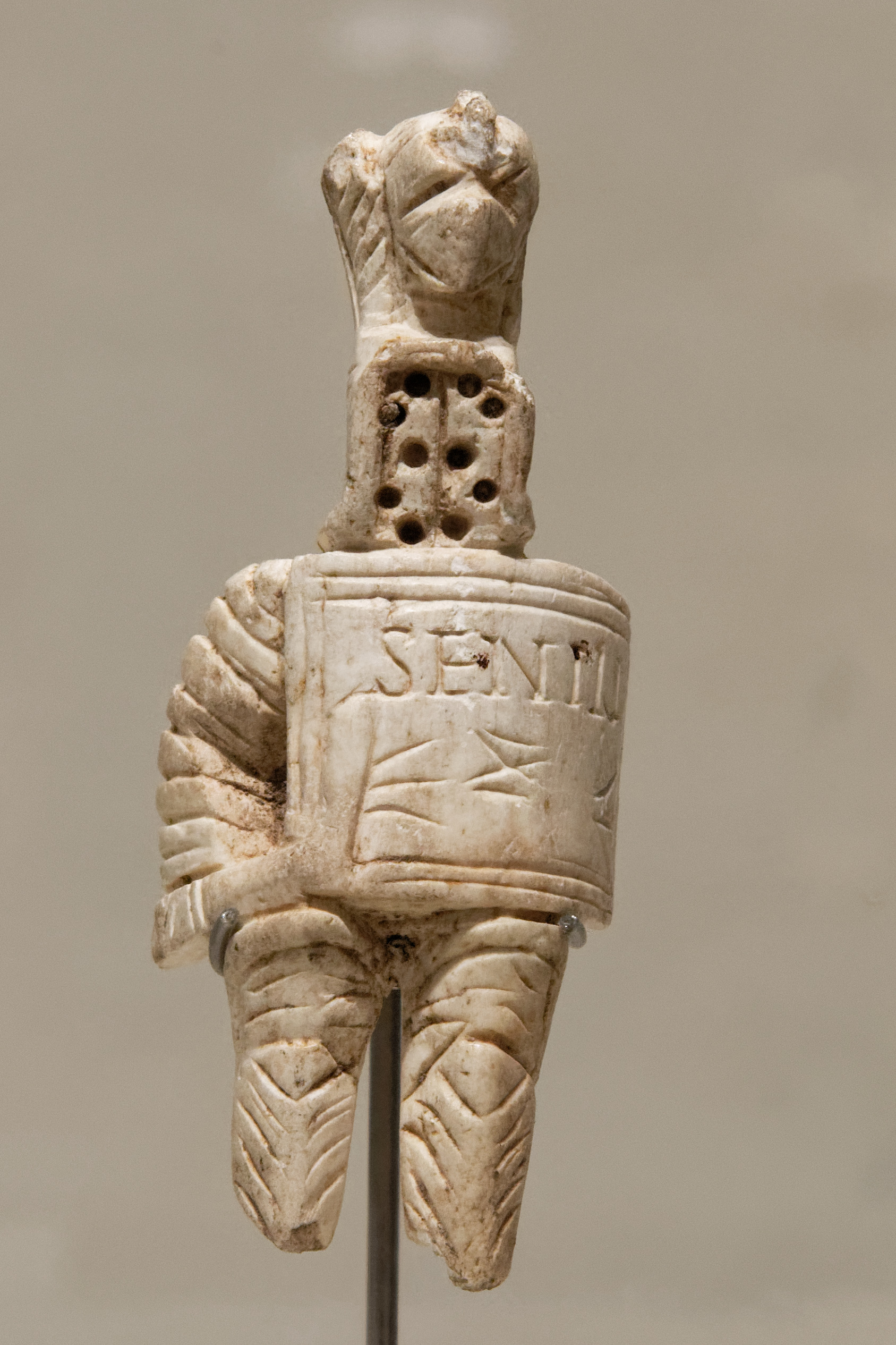
Thraex sculpted from ivory as a knife handle (2nd century AD)

A passage in Petronius indicates that "Thracian" was a style of gladiatorial fighting taught in training schools. An inscription records a doctor thraecum, a teacher of would-be Thracians.

== See also ==
- List of Roman gladiator types
- Spartacus
- Ludus Dacicus

== Sources ==
- Carter, M. J. (2006). "Gladiatorial Combat: The Rules of Engagement". Classical Journal. 102 (2): 97–114. JSTOR 30038038.
- Bronze figurine of a gladiator - British Museum
- Terracotta figurine of 2 gladiators - British Museum
- E. Köhne and C. Ewigleben (eds.). Gladiators and Caesars: The Power of Spectacles in Ancient Rome. London: The British Museum Press, 2000.
