= Murmillo =

Type of Roman gladiator

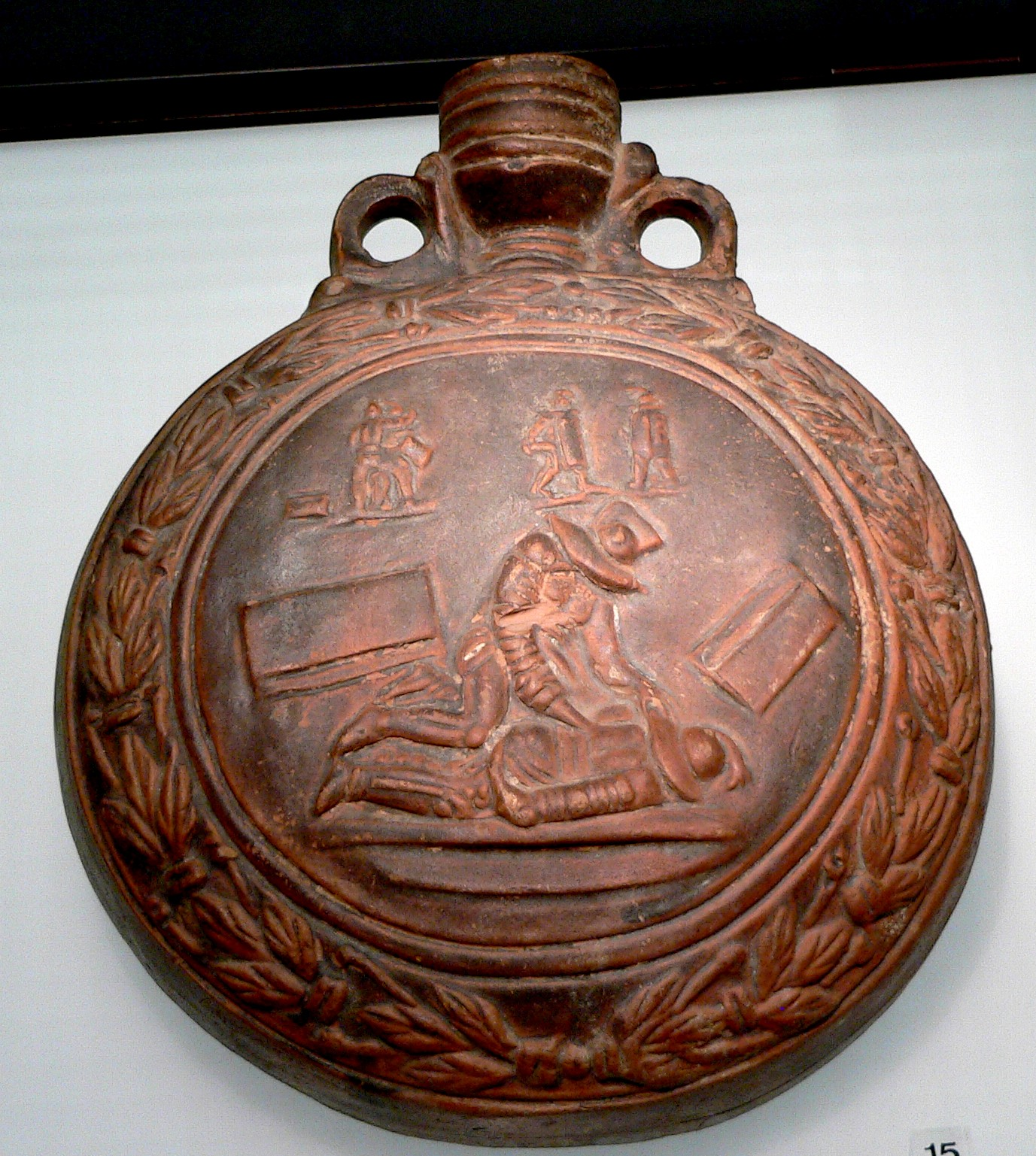
A murmillo defeating a thraex, depicted on a first- or second-century Roman canteen

The murmillo (also sometimes spelled "mirmillo", "myrmillo"; pl. murmillones) was a type of gladiator during the Roman Imperial age. The murmillo-class gladiator developed in the early Imperial period to replace the earlier Gallus-type gladiator, named after the warriors of Gaul (Latin: Gallus, lit. 'a Gaul'). As the Gauls inhabiting Italy had become well integrated with the Romans by the time of the reign (27 BCE to 14 CE) of Augustus, it became undesirable to portray them as enemy outsiders; the Gallus-class gladiator thus fell out of use.

The designation murmillo originated with the Greek word μορμύρος (mormyrus) for a type of fish - murmillo gladiators could wear a Gallic-model helmet incorporating fish-imagery.

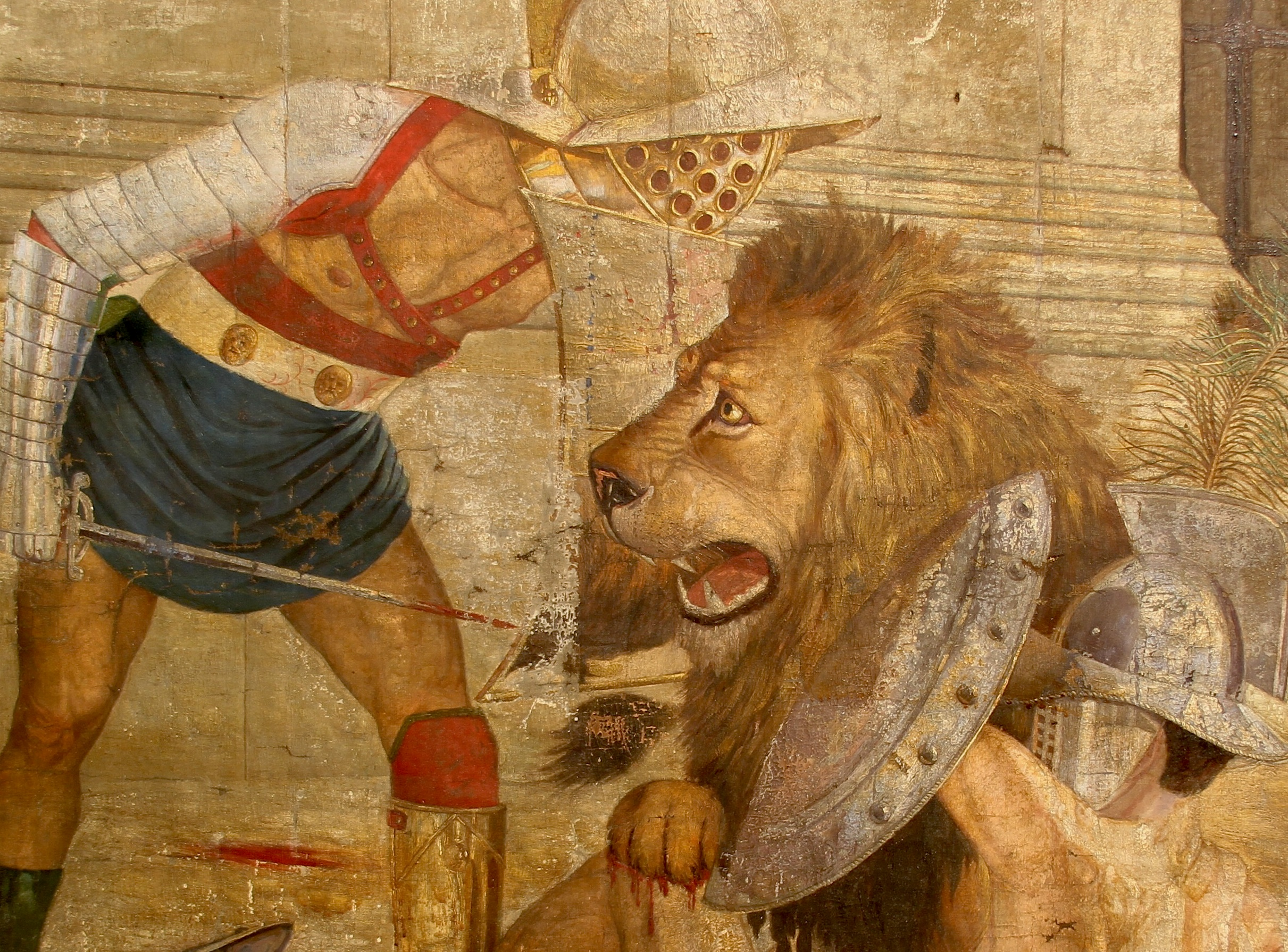
Gladiator fighting a lion in the Colosseum

== Equipment and armaments ==
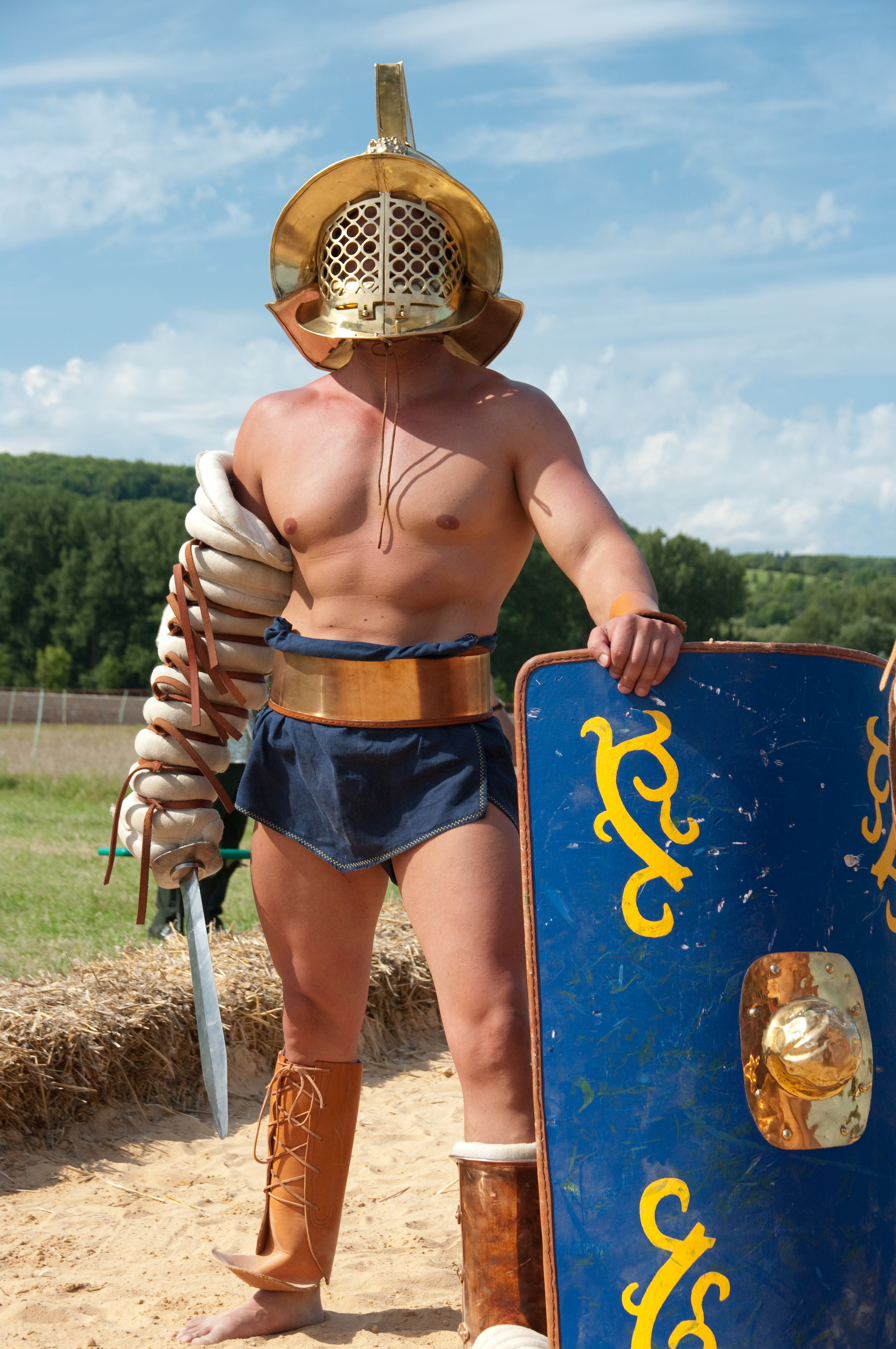
Modern re-enactment of a murmillo.

The murmillo was armed with:

- Gladius: Roman sword with a length of 64–81 cm and weight of 1.2-1.6 kg with a handle made of bone.
- Scutum: Rectangular shield made of vertically connected wooden boards with a small bronze boss which protects the shield's handle.
- Balteus: Leather belt with metal decorations and supplements, similar to current boxing title belt
- Manica: Segmented or scaled arm guard made of leather or some metal alloys. Manicae can also be mailed.
- Cassis Crista: A large helmet with plume crest or horsehair, usually made of bronze, with an ornate 'grill' face visor. Usually based on the broad-rimmed Greek Boeotian helmet.
- Ocrea: Shin guard/protector made of bronze, iron or other metals.
- Fasciae: Thick soft padding on legs which are used to wear ocreas in order to prevent calluses and blisters.

== Style ==
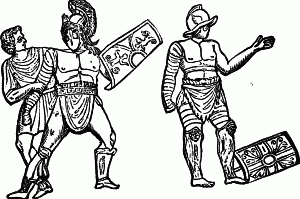
Combat between a Murmillo and a Samnite.

The murmillo usually fought the thraex (Thracian) or hoplomachus, with whom he shared some of the equipment (notably arm guards and all-enclosing helmet, and the dangerous short sword). A number of ancient authors, including Valerius Maximus and Quintillian, assert that he also regularly fought the retiarius. It would certainly have been an unusual pairing, contrasting a heavily protected gladiator with a fast but lightly equipped one. It would have been rather appropriate however, to have the retiarius, depicting a fisherman, fighting a Murmillo depicting a fish or sea monster. This pairing is disputed; visual depictions of murmillones usually show them fighting the thraex or hoplomachus rather than the retiarius. However, Channel 4's Time Team discovered in Wales a carved penknife handle depicting a retiarius and a murmillo fighting.

The murmillo's fighting style was suited for men with strong arms and shoulders due to carrying the weight of the shield, sword and heavy helmet. As a result, murmillones were usually tall and always very muscular. The murmillo depended on his strength and endurance to survive the battle against foes who were more suited to attacking. The tower shield gave him an edge in defence and the gladius enabled him to thrust and swing at his enemies when in close range. The murmillones were also trained to kick their enemies with the thick padding worn around their legs.

Examples of pairing murmillones with other gladiator types can be seen in frescoes and graffiti in Pompeii. In one well-preserved example, a murmillo named Marcus Atillus, who is credited with one match and one victory, is depicted standing over the defeated figure of Lucius Raecius Felix, a gladiator who is credited with 12 matches and 12 victories. His opponent is shown kneeling, disarmed and unhelmeted. The graffiti records that Felix survived the fight and was granted his freedom (manumission).

== See also ==
- List of Roman gladiator types
