= Secutor =

Class of gladiator in Rome

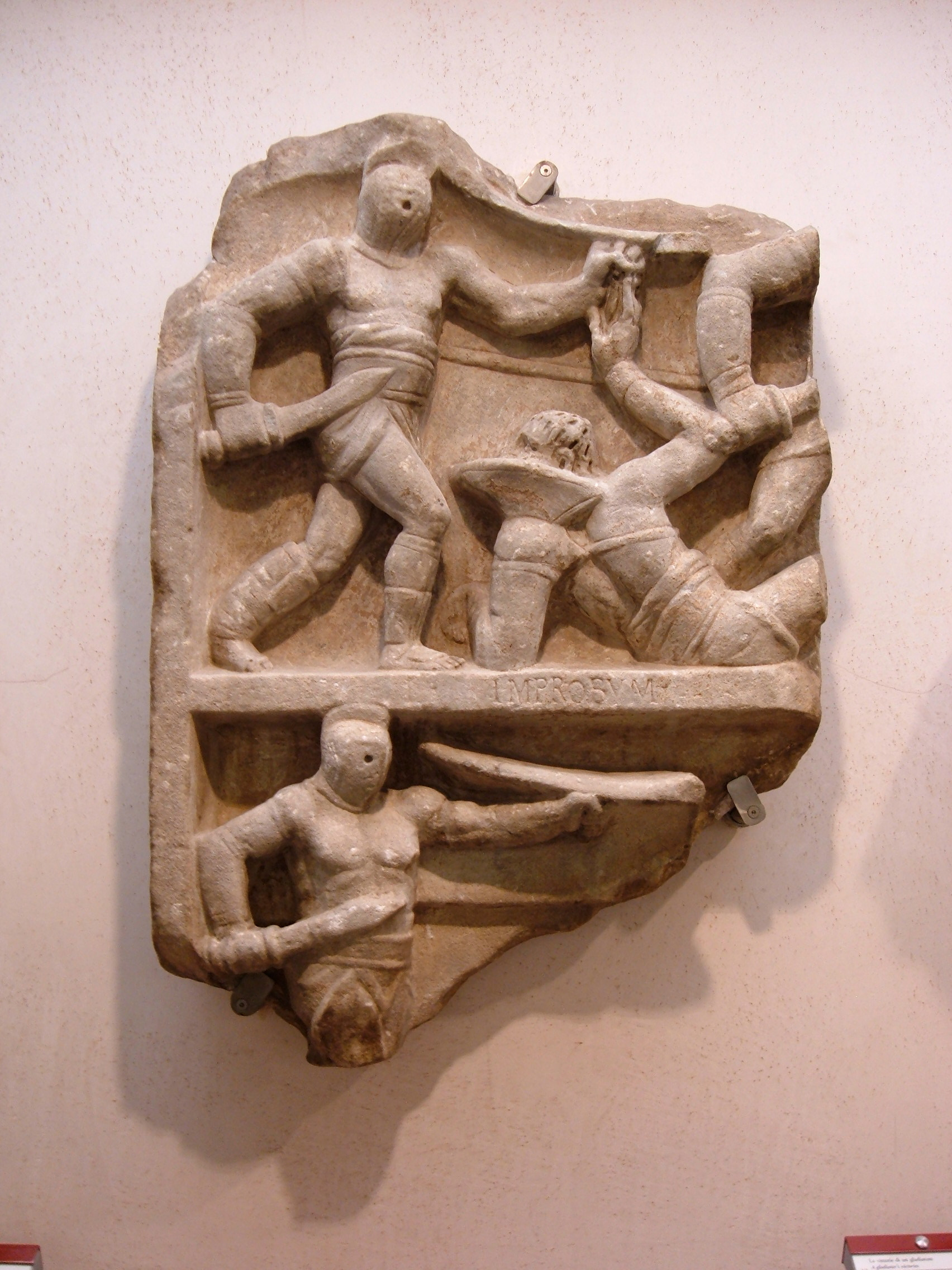
Secutor

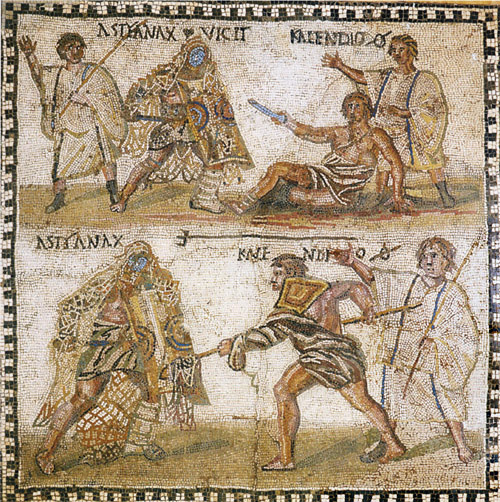
Mosaic, 4th century AD, showing a retiarius or "net fighter", with a trident and cast net, fighting a secutor

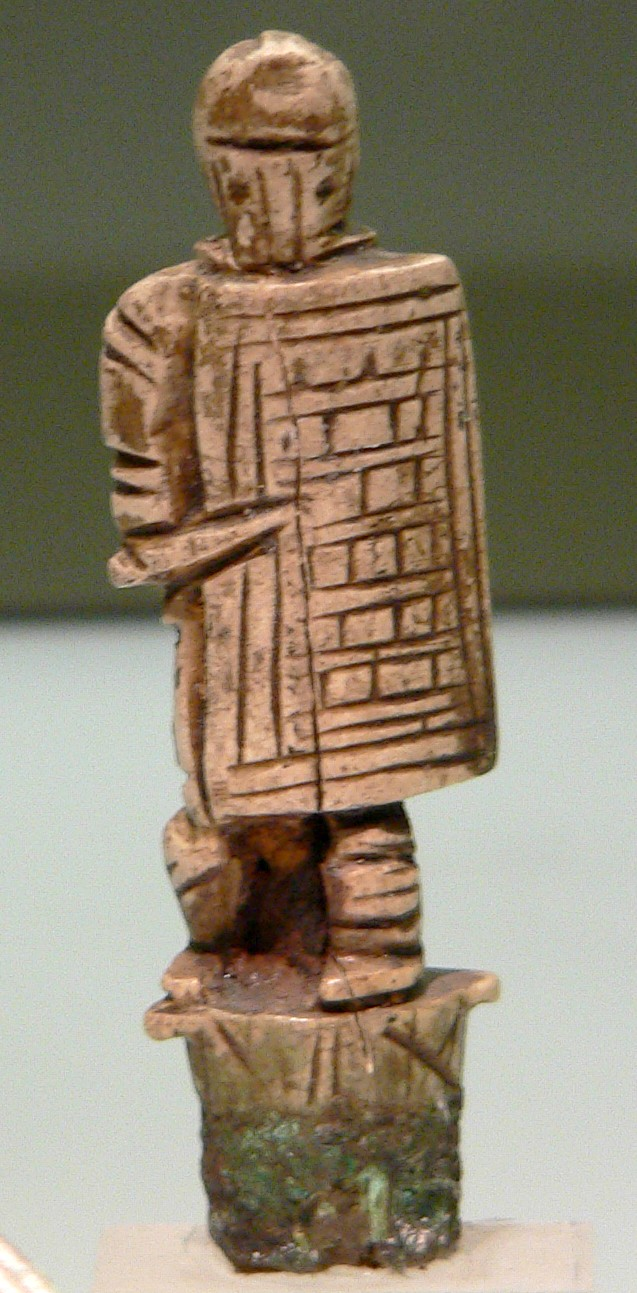
Knife handle in the form of a secutor, showing the distinctive shield, helmet, and sword

A secutor (pl. secutores) was a class of gladiator in ancient Rome. Thought to have originated around AD 50, the secutor ("follower" or "chaser", from sequor "I follow, come or go after") was armed similarly to the murmillo gladiator and like the murmillo, was protected by a heavy shield. A secutor usually carried a short sword, a gladius, or a dagger. The secutor was specially trained to fight a retiarius, a type of lightly armoured gladiator armed with a trident and net.

== Equipment ==
The secutor wore a subligaculum (loincloth) and a balteus (a wide belt much like that of the retiarius). On his right arm he wore a manica (a heavy linen or metal wrapping tied with leather thongs). On his left leg he wore an ocrea (a greave made of boiled leather or metal). He also carried a scutum (a curved rectangular shield) to protect himself.

The very distinctive helmet of the secutor had only two small eye-holes, in order to prevent a retiarius' trident from being thrust through the face, as well as a rounded top, so as not to get caught in a net. The flanges protecting his neck were smooth and shaped like fish fins for this purpose. Because of the weight and lack of space in the helmet, the secutor had to win quickly, lest he fall to exhaustion or faint due to breathing constrictions and heavy armor.

== Opponent ==
The secutor was specially trained to fight a retiarius, a type of lightly armoured gladiator armed with a trident and net. This matchup was particularly popular, as it pitted the secutor's heavy armor against the lightweight retiarius. On account of his heavy armor, a secutor was prone to exhaustion during longer matches, and thus relied on quickly concluding the battle to gain victory. The retiarius was lightly equipped in order to evade the secutor's attacks, attempting to exhaust the secutor.

The match-up dramatized an encounter between the "fisherman" (retiarius) and a "fish" (secutor). The retiarius used his net to catch the secutor who was equipped with fish-themed armor bearing scaly patterns and smooth contours. Isidore of Seville noted an association between the retiarius with Neptune, the god of water, and the secutor with Vulcan, the god of fire. He reasons that this is because fire is a pursuer, and fire and water are always at odds.

== Famous secutores ==
=== Flamma ===
A Syrian, he died at the age of 30, after having fought 34 times—winning 21, drawing 9, and needing missio (to be spared) only four times. Flamma also received the highest reward four times, a rudi (wooden sparring sword), which came with the opportunity to stop being a gladiator. Each time he refused the offer, and continued his career.

=== Commodus ===
Roman Emperor Commodus fought as a secutor, taking to the arena 735 times. His victories were often welcomed by his bested opponents, as bearing scars dealt by the hand of an Emperor were considered a mark of fortitude. Commodus' opponents always surrendered after they were bested. Commodus never killed his gladiatorial adversaries, instead accepting their surrenders.

Commodus' time as a gladiator was not well received by the Roman public. According to Herodian, spectators of Commodus thought it unbecoming of an emperor to take up arms in the amphitheater for sport when he could be campaigning against barbarians among other opponents of Rome. The consensus was that it was below his office to participate as a gladiator.

After Commodus' death in 192 AD, the Roman Senate imposed damnatio memoriae upon Commodus. As a result of his damnation, according to Cassius Dio, the Roman public no longer referred to Commodus by his name or as Emperor after his death. Instead, he was referred to as 'the gladiator' or 'the charioteer' as a means to demean his name.

== See also ==
- List of Roman gladiator types
