= Fishing net =

Net used for fishing

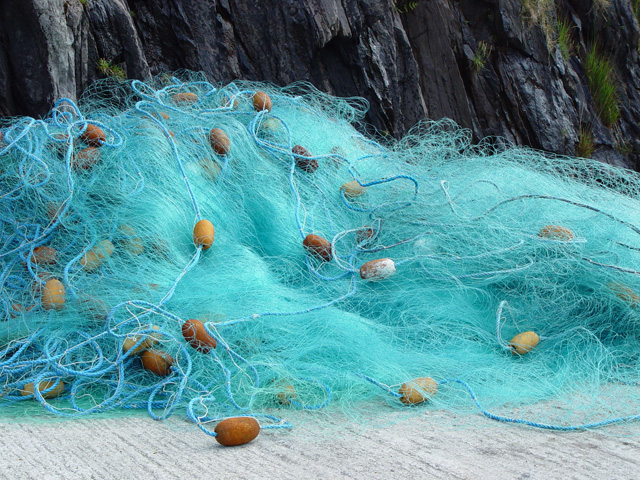
Nylon fishing net with float line attached to small plastic floats

A fishing net or fish net is a net used for fishing. Fishing nets work by serving as an improvised fish trap, and some are indeed rigged as traps (e.g. fyke nets). They are usually wide open when deployed (e.g. by casting or trawling), and then close off when retrieved to engulf and trap fish and other aquatic animals that are larger than the holes/gaps of the net, as well as many unwanted bycatches due to the underwater area a net can cover.

Fishing nets are usually meshes formed by knotting a relatively thin thread, and early nets were woven from grasses, vines, flaxes and other fiber crop material, while later woven cotton was used. Modern nets are usually made of artificial polyamides like nylon, although nets of organic polyamides such as wool or silk thread were common until recently and are still used.

== History ==
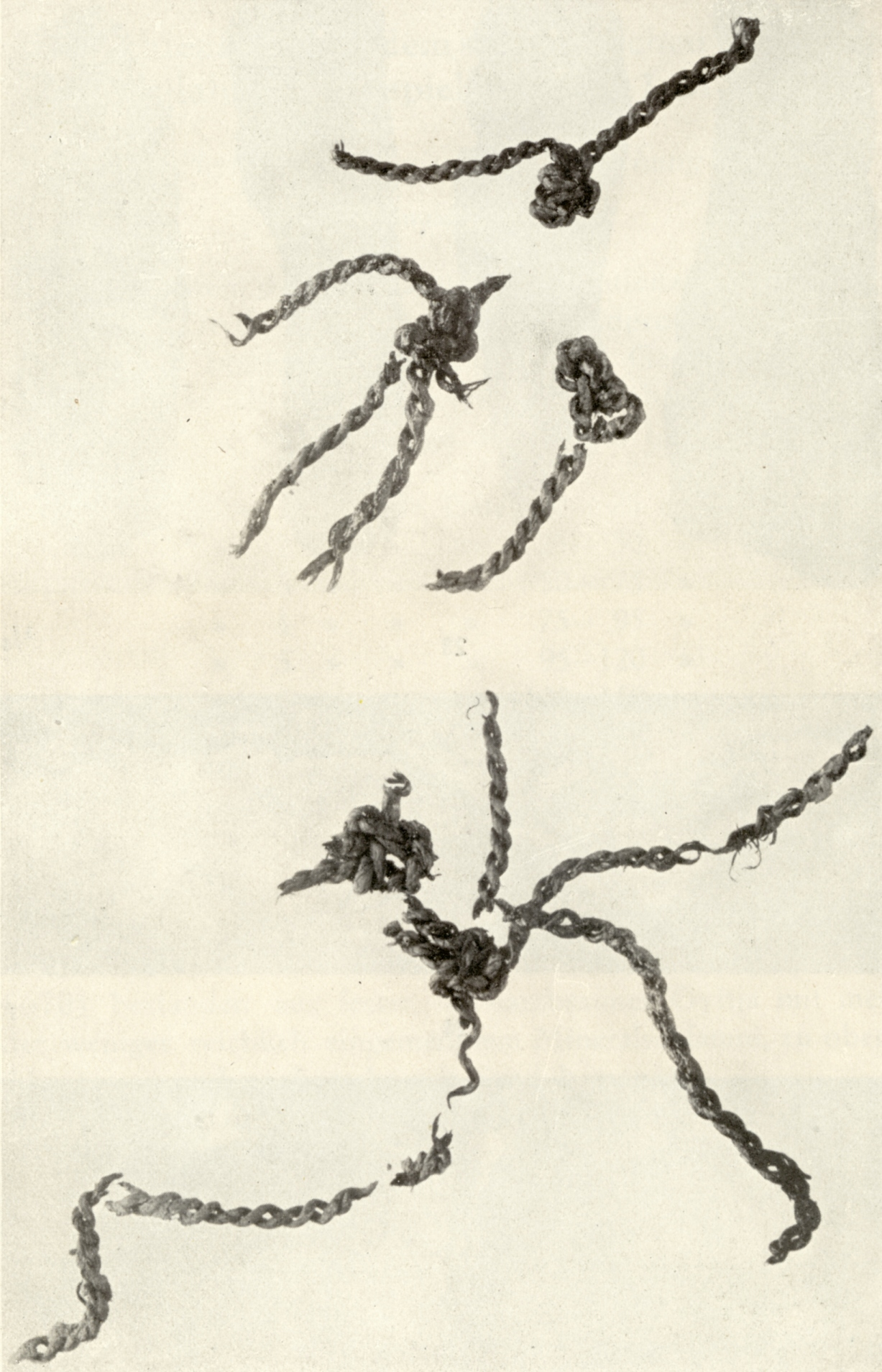
Pieces of the Antrea Net, 8,300 BC, the oldest-known fishing net

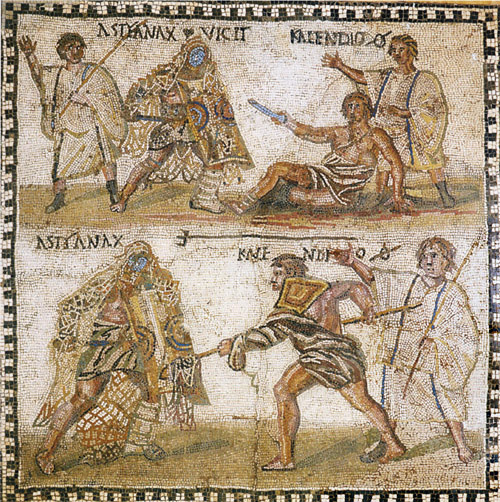
A retiarius ("net fighter"), with a trident and cast net, fighting a secutor (mosaic, 4th century BC)

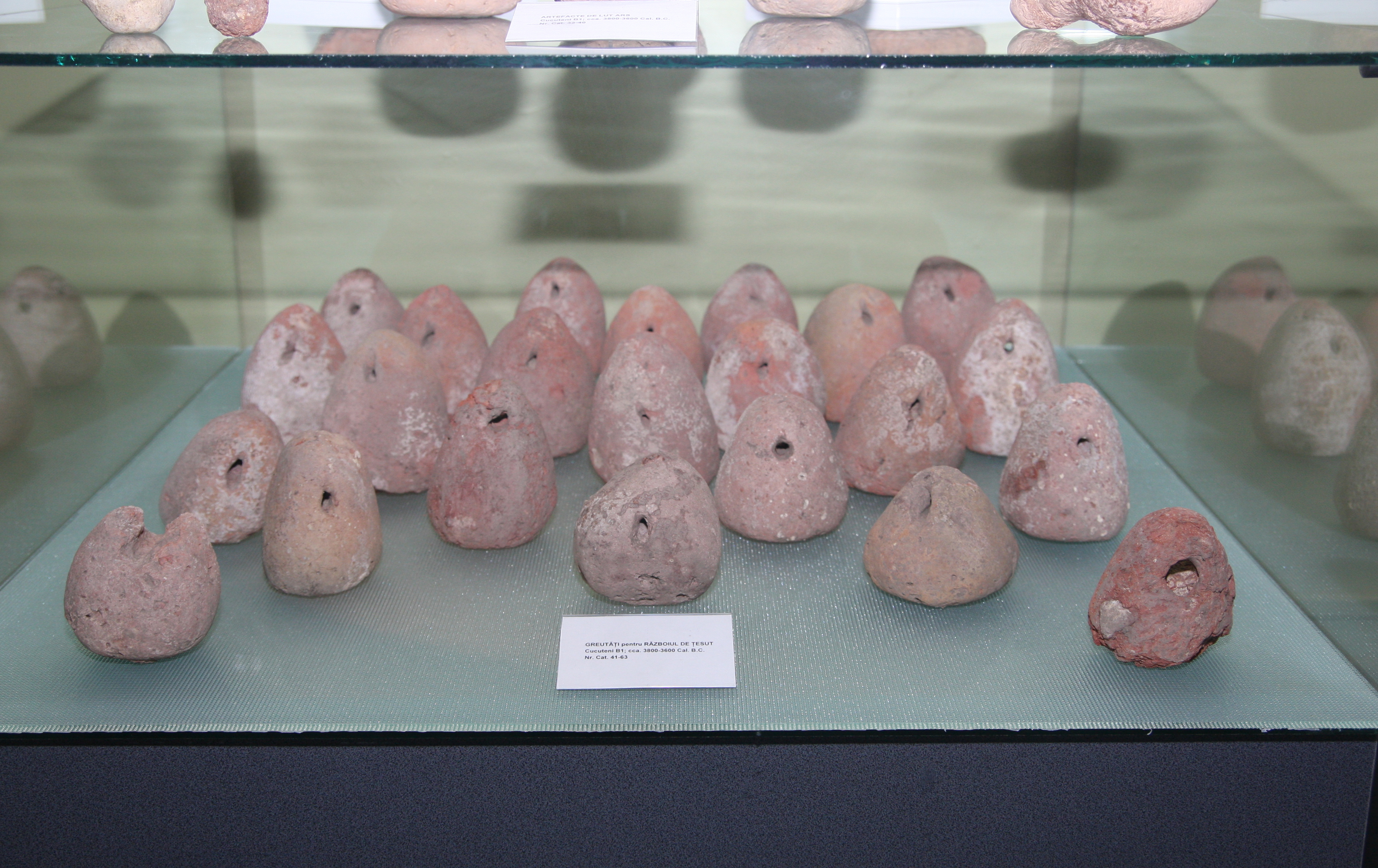
Cucuteni-Trypillian ceramic weights

Fishing nets have been used widely in the past, including by stone age societies. The oldest known fishing net is the net of Antrea, found with other fishing equipment in the Karelian town of Antrea, Finland, in 1913. The net was made from willow, and dates back to 8300 BC. Recently, fishing net sinkers from 27,000 BC were discovered in Korea, making them the oldest fishing implements discovered, to date, in the world. The remnants of another fishing net dates back to the late Mesolithic, and were found together with sinkers at the bottom of a former sea. Some of the oldest rock carvings at Alta (4200–500 BC) have mysterious images, including intricate patterns of horizontal and vertical lines sometimes explained as fishing nets. American Native Indians on the Columbia River wove seine nets from spruce root fibers or wild grass, again using stones as weights. For floats they used sticks made of cedar which moved in a way which frightened the fish and helped keep them together. With the help of large canoes, pre-European Maori deployed seine nets which could be over one thousand metres long. The nets were woven from green flax, with stone weights and light wood or gourd floats, and could require hundreds of men to haul.

Fishing nets are well documented in antiquity. They appear in Egyptian tomb paintings from 3000 BC. In ancient Roman literature, Ovid makes many references to fishing nets, including the use of cork floats and lead weights. Pictorial evidence of Roman fishing comes from mosaics which show nets. In a parody of fishing, a type of gladiator called retiarius was armed with a trident and a cast net. He would fight against a secutor or the murmillo, who carried a short sword and a helmet with the image of a fish on the front. Between 177 and 180 the Greek author Oppian wrote the Halieutica, a didactic poem about fishing. He described various means of fishing including the use of nets cast from boats, scoop nets held open by a hoop, and various traps "which work while their masters sleep". Here is Oppian's description of fishing with a "motionless" net:

The fishers set up very light nets of buoyant flax and wheel in a circle round about while they violently strike the surface of the sea with their oars and make a din with sweeping blow of poles. At the flashing of the swift oars and the noise the fish bound in terror and rush into the bosom of the net which stands at rest, thinking it to be a shelter: foolish fishes which, frightened by a noise, enter the gates of doom. Then the fishers on either side hasten with the ropes to draw the net ashore.

In Norse mythology the sea giantess Rán uses a fishing net to trap lost sailors. References to fishing nets can also be found in the New Testament. Jesus Christ was reputedly a master in the use of fishing nets. The tough, fibrous inner bark of the pawpaw was used by Native Americans and settlers in the Midwest for making ropes and fishing nets. The archaeological site at León Viejo (1524–1610) has fishing net artifacts including fragments of pottery used as weights for fishing nets.

Fishing nets have not evolved greatly, and many contemporary fishing nets would be recognized for what they are in Neolithic times. However, the fishing lines from which the nets are constructed have hugely evolved. Fossilised fragments of "probably two-ply laid rope of about 7 mm diameter" have been found in one of the caves at Lascaux, dated about 15,000 BC. Egyptian rope dates back to 4000 to 3500 BC and was generally made of water reed fibers. Other rope in antiquity was made from the fibers of date palms, flax, grass, papyrus, leather, or animal hair. Rope made of hemp fibres was in use in China from about 2800 BC.

In modern times, hemp was almost the only material in large scale use in fishing gear until 1900 when it found competition from cotton. By 1950s cotton had taken over a large fraction of fishing nets, although hemp nets were still in use in large quantities. The first nylon fishing nets emerged in Japan in 1949 (although tests of similar equipment were taking place around the world in the last years of the 1940s). In the 1950s they were adopted worldwide, replacing nets made from cotton or hemp that were used before. The introduction of synthetic fibres in fishing gear from around 1950 changed a way of using natural materials that goes back several thousands of years. In the following decades (for example in Norway in 1975, 95% of all fishing gear was made of synthetic fibre), the new synthetic materials conquered the hegemony in net fishing.

Fishing nets in the past

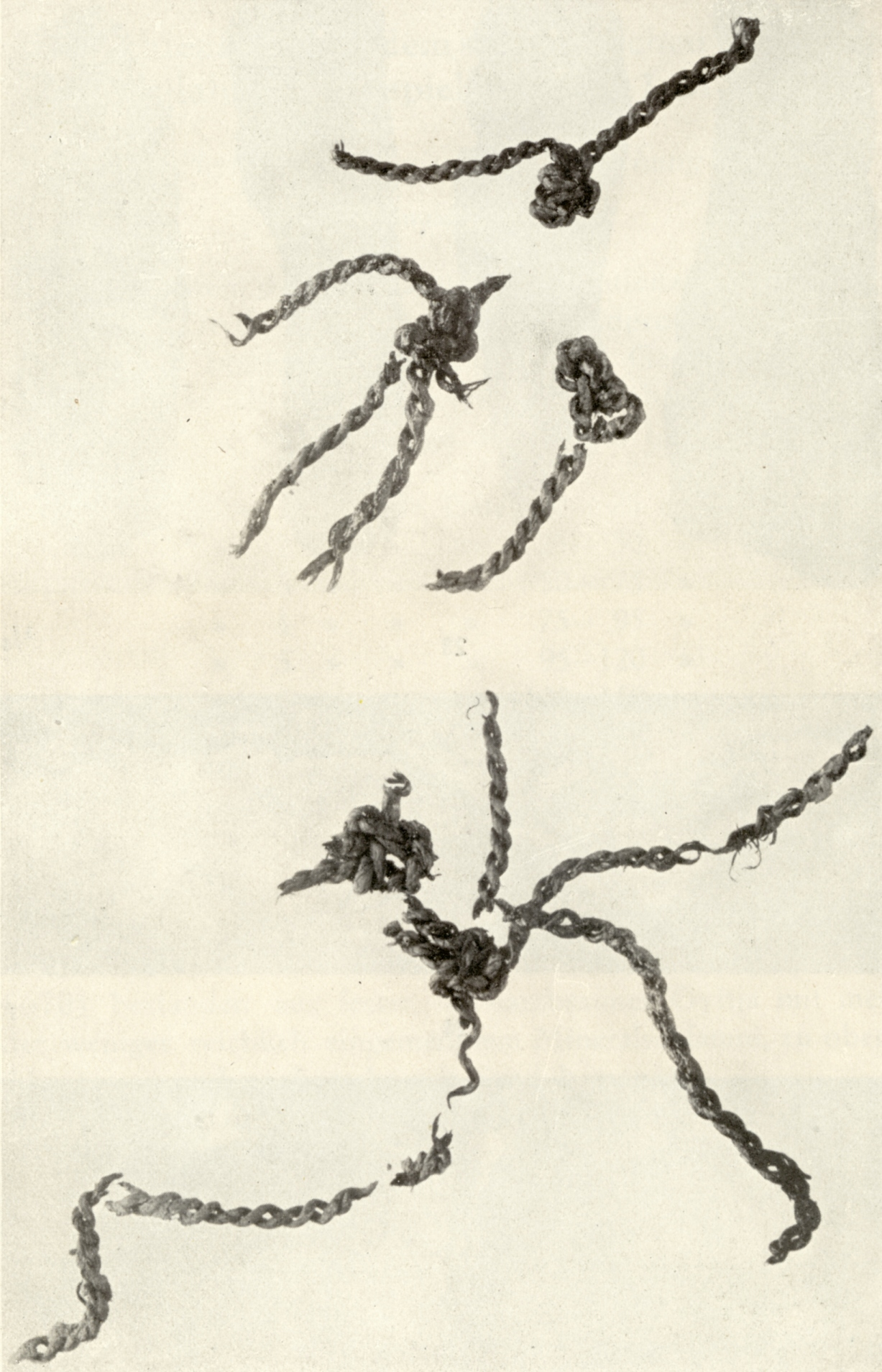
Fragments from the net of Antrea 8300 BC

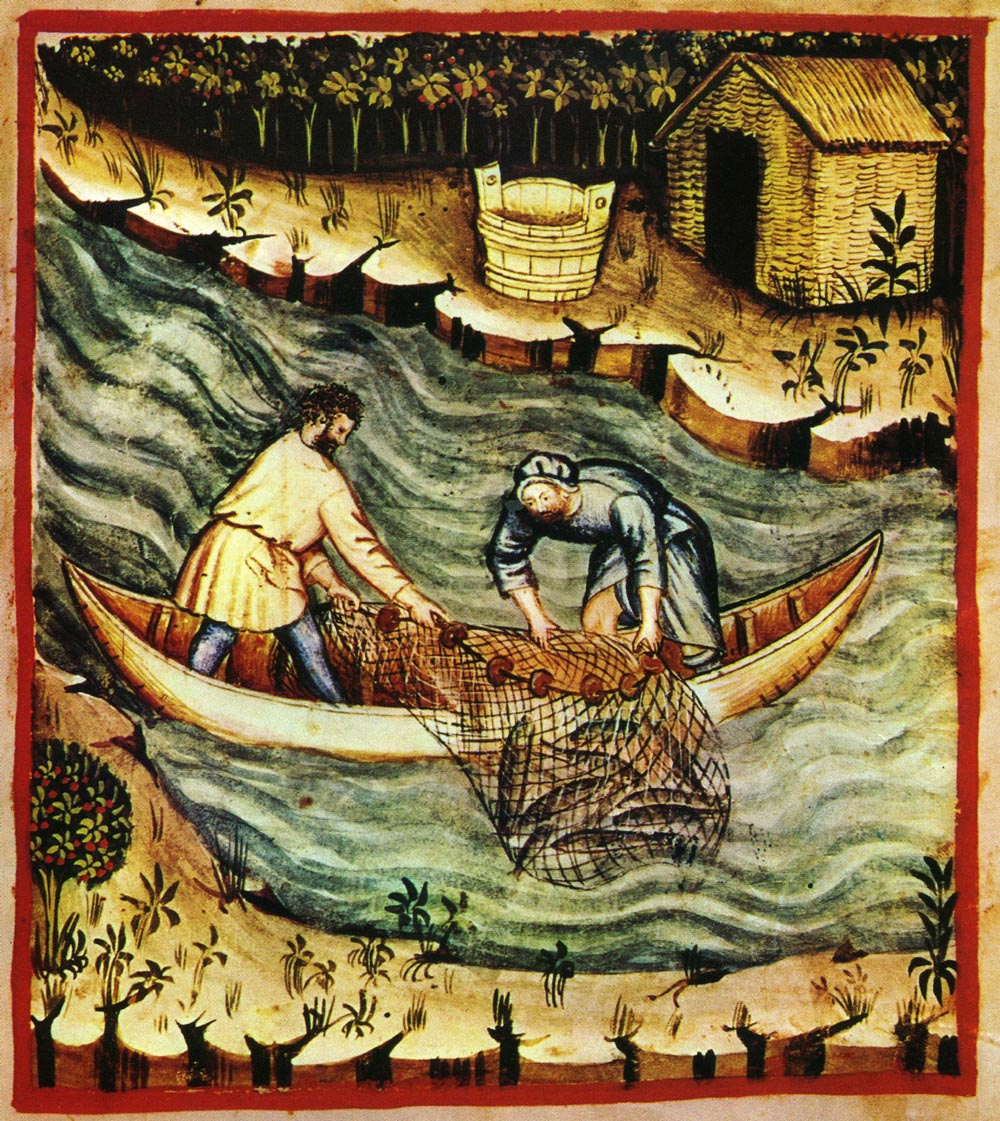
Tacuinum sanitatis casanatensis, Baghdad, 14th century

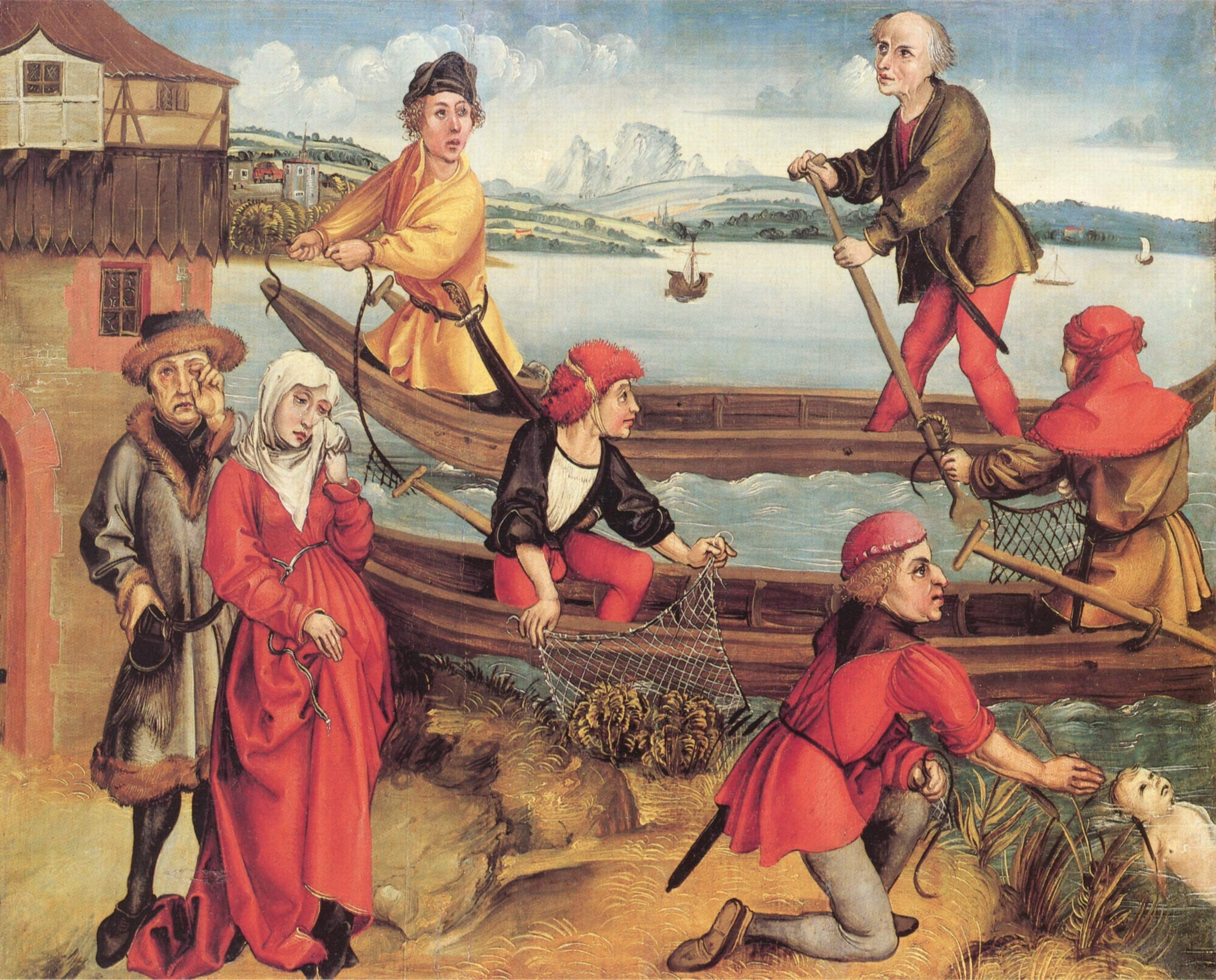
Albrecht Dürer c. 1490-1493

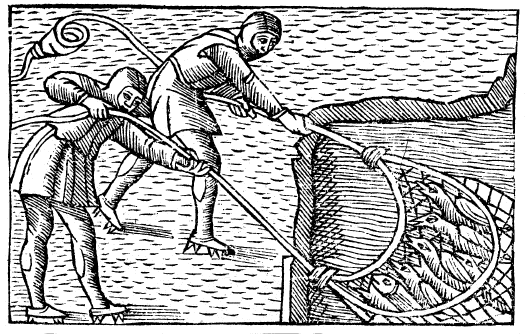
Medieval Scandinavian ice fishing technique 1555

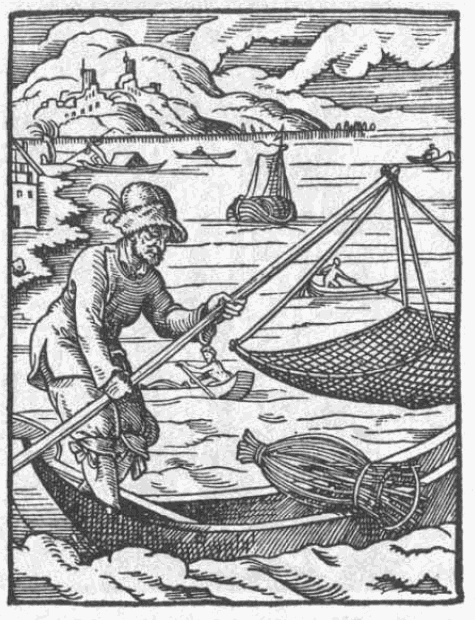
Fisherman with net and trap in Germany, 1568

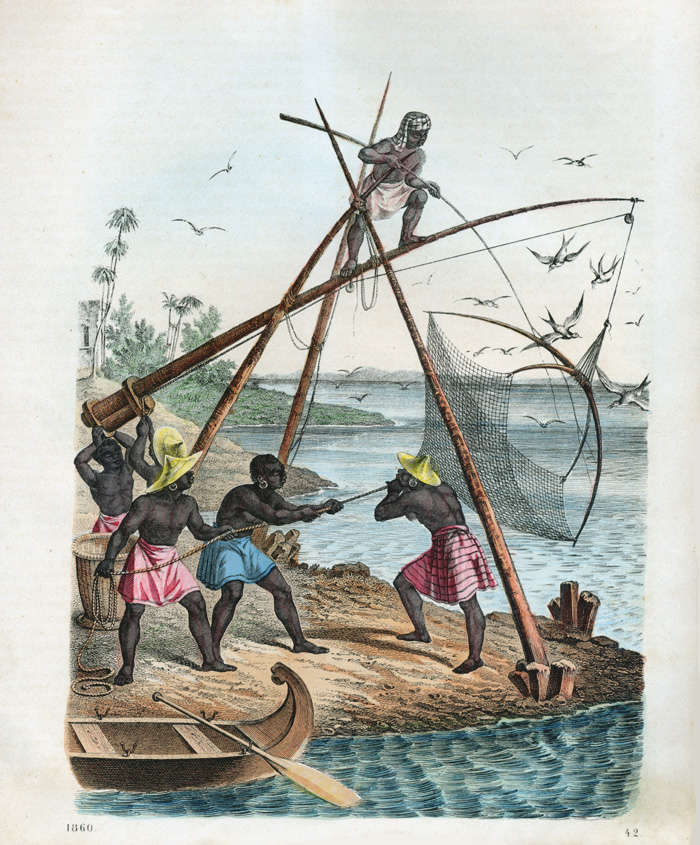
The Chinese fishing nets of Fort Cochin, India (depiction from the 1840s)

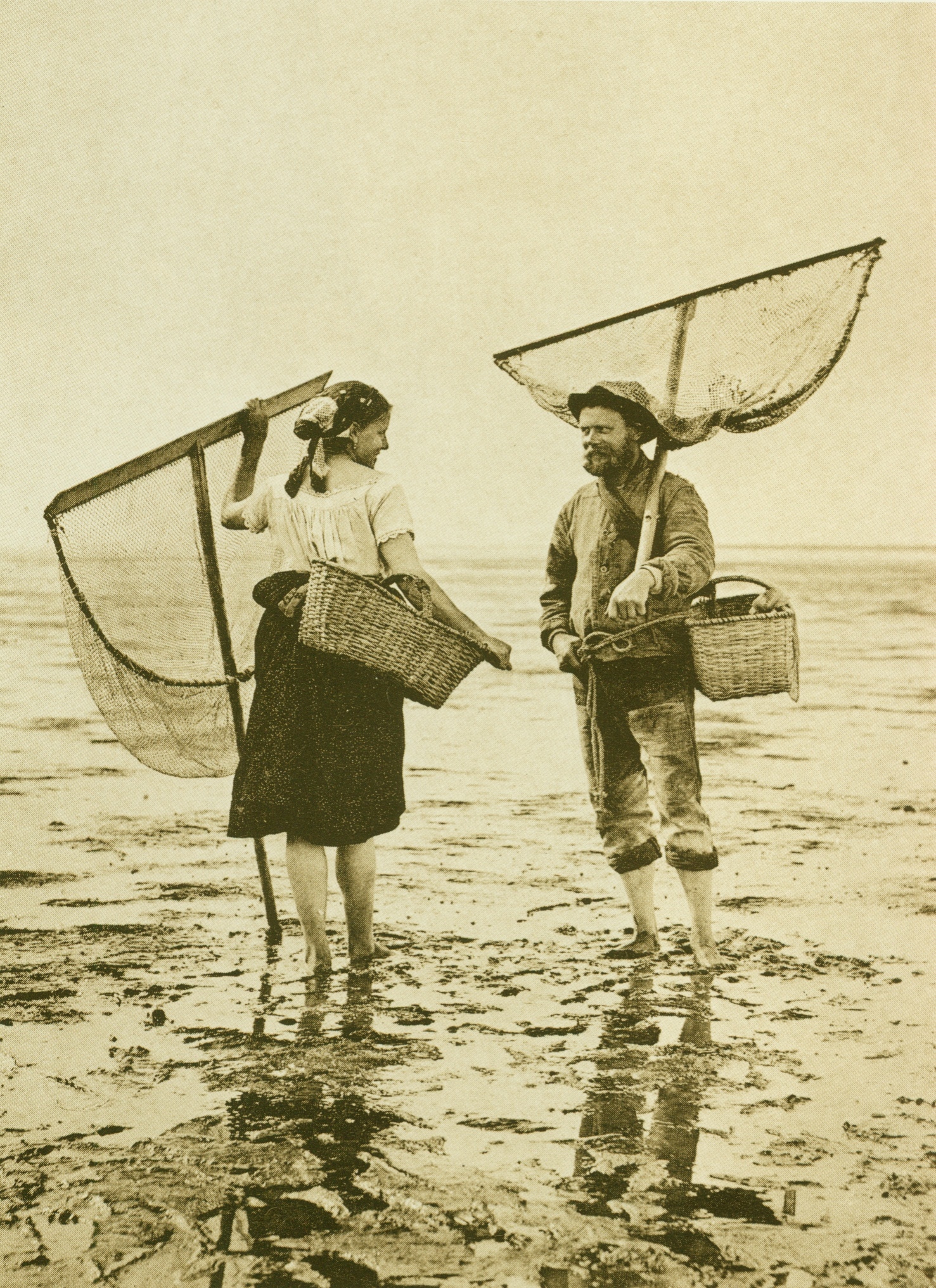
Crab fishing, 1891–1895

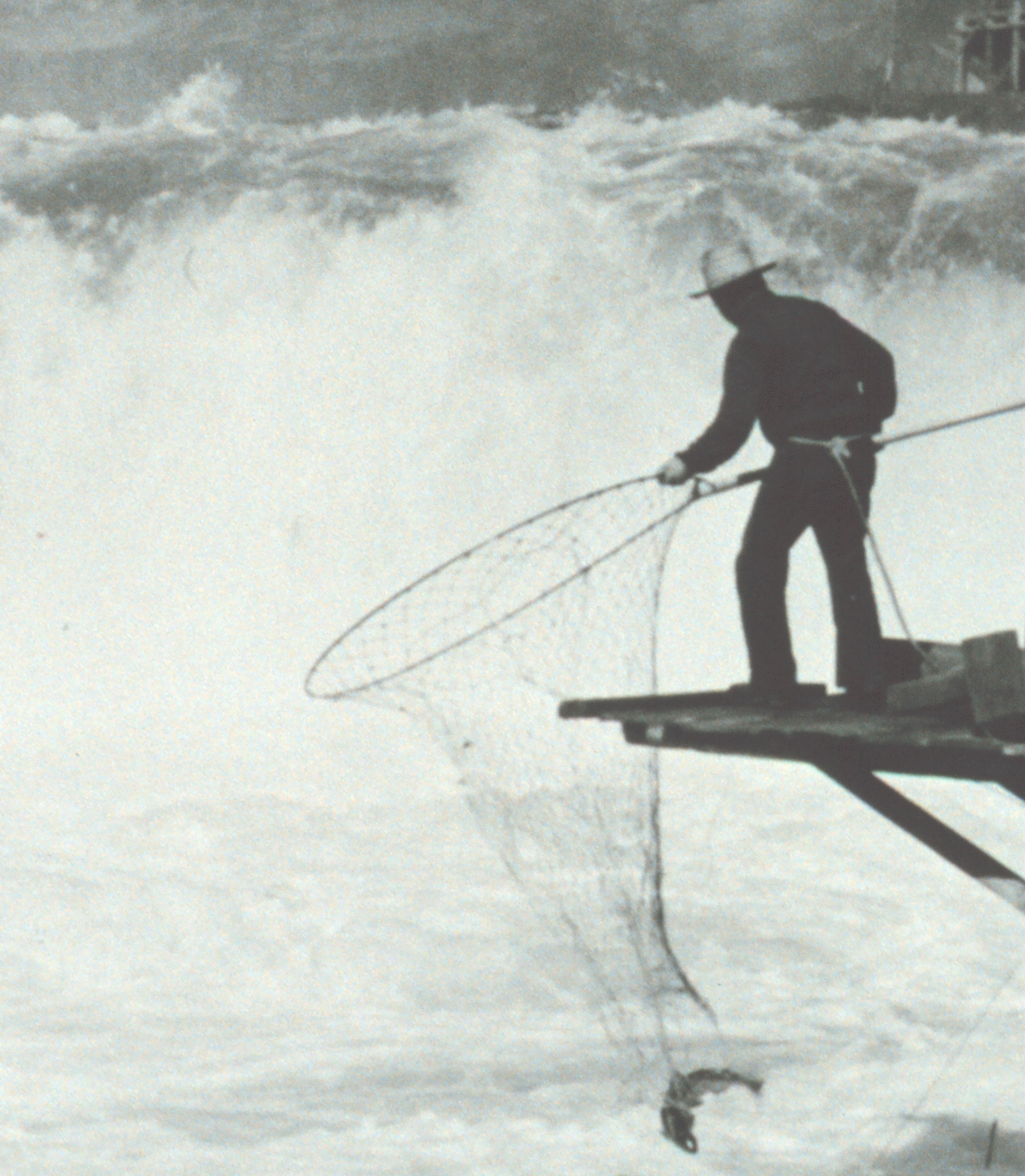
Native American fishing salmon with loop net 1938

== Types ==
Type	Image	Target fish	Description	Environmental impact
Bottom trawl		Demersal fish such as groundfish, cod, squid, halibut and rockfish	A trawl is a large net, conical in shape, designed to be towed along the sea bottom. The trawl is pulled through the water by one or more boats, called trawlers or draggers. The activity of pulling the trawl through the water is called trawling or dragging.	Bottom trawling results in a lot of bycatch and can damage the sea floor. A single pass along the seafloor can remove 5 to 25% of the seabed life. A 2005 report of the UN Millennium Project, commissioned by UN Secretary-General Kofi Annan, recommended the elimination of bottom trawling on the high seas by 2006 to protect seamounts and other ecologically sensitive habitats. In mid-October 2006, US President Bush joined other world leaders calling for a moratorium on deep-sea trawling.
Cast net		Schooling and other small fish	Cast nets (throw nets) are small round nets with weights on the edges which are thrown by the fisher. Sizes vary up to about four metres in diameter. The net is thrown by hand in such a manner that it spreads out on the water and sinks. Fish are caught as the net is hauled back in.	High discrimination possible. Non targeted fish can be released unharmed.
Coracle net fishing			Coracle fishing is performed by two people, each seated in a coracle, plying their paddle with one hand and holding a shared net with the other. When a fish is caught, each hauls up their end of the net until the two coracles are brought to touch and the fish is secured.	
Dragnet			This is a general term which can be applied to any net which is dragged or hauled across a river or along the bottom of a lake or sea. An example is the seine net shown in the image. The fishing depth of this net can be adjusted by adding weights to the bottom.	
Beach seine		Schooling fish in shallow coastal waters	A beach seine is a long net deployed from shore and hauled back by a group of fishers standing in shallow water. The technique encircles fish as the net is gradually pulled toward the beach. It is widely used by small coastal communities for subsistence and artisanal fishing. | Low seabed impact when used on sandy shores. Bycatch varies with mesh size, but generally lower than mechanized drag nets.	
Drift net			The drift net is a net that is not anchored, but is drifting with the current. It is usually a gill or tangle net, and is commonly used in the coastal waters of many countries. Its use on the high seas is prohibited, but still occurs.	
Drive-in net			A drive-in net is another fixed net, used by small-scale fishermen in some fisheries in Japan and South Asia, particularly in the Philippines. It is used to catch schooling forage fish such as fusiliers and other reef fish. It is a dustpan-shaped net, resembling a trawl net with long wings. The front part of the net is laid along the seabed. The fishermen either wait until a school swims into the net, or they drive fish into it by creating some sort of commotion. Then the net is closed by lifting the front end so the fish cannot escape.	
Fixed gillnet (on stakes)			Fixed gillnets are nets for catching fish in shallow intertidal zones. It consists of a sheet of network stretched on stakes fixed into the ground (or anchors), generally in rivers or where the sea ebbs and flows, for entangling and catching the fish.	
Fyke net			Fyke nets are bag-shaped nets which are held open by hoops. These can be linked together in long chains, and are used to catch eels in rivers. If fyke nets are equipped with wings and leaders, they can also be used in sheltered places in lakes where there is plenty of plant life. Hundreds of these nets can be connected into systems where it is not practical to build large traps. It is similar to putcher fishing.	
Gillnet		Sardines, salmon, cod	The gillnet catches fish which try to pass through it by snagging on the gill covers. Thus trapped, the fish can neither advance through the net nor retreat. Uses a system of nets with floats and weights. The nets are anchored to the sea floor and allowed to float at the surface	Animals cannot see the net, so they swim into it and are tangled. High risk of bycatch.
Ghost net			Ghost nets are nets that have been lost at sea. They may continue to be a menace to marine life for many years.	
Haaf net		Salmon	The haaf net is set in a rectangular wooden frame usually about four or five metres long and two metres wide supported by three legs. A central pole extends from one of the longer edges at a right angle. The fisherman wades into deep water and submerges the net, holding it upright with the central pole. When a fish swims into the net the fisherman tilts the pole backwards to scoop the net upwards, thereby trapping the fish.	
Hand net			Hand nets, also called scoop or dip nets, are held open by a hoop and may be attached to a short or a long stiff handle. They have been known since antiquity and can be used for sweeping up fish near the water surface like muskellunge and northern pike. When such a net is used by an angler to help land a fish, it is a landing net. In England, hand netting is the only legal way of catching eels and has been practised for thousands of years on the Rivers Parrett and Severn.	
Keepnet			Keepnets are tube-shaped nets used to keep caught fish alive by serving as an improvised fish cage. When in use, the main body of the net is submerged in the same waterbody, and any fish placed inside can still breathe and move around but cannot escape because the only exit of the net is fixed on land or above water. It is a far more humane tool to contain captured fish alive than fish stringers, though also more cumbersome to transport and deploy.	
Landing net			Landing nets are short-handled handnets that are used to help lift fish out of the water, most commonly in angling. Landing nets are typically used for catching medium-sized game fish such as the common carp, salmon/trout and pike, which are too heavy to lifted by the fishing line alone.	
Lave net			A special form of large hand net is the lave net, now used in very few locations on the River Severn in England and Wales. The lave net is set in the water and the fisherman waits till he feels a fish hit against the mesh and the net is then lifted. Fish as large as sturgeon are caught in lave nets.	
Lift net			A lift net has an opening which faces upwards. The net is first submerged to a desired depth, and then lifted or hauled from the water. It can be lifted either manually (hand lift net) or mechanically (shore-operated lift net), and can be operated on a boat (boat-operated lift net)	
Midwater trawl		Pelagic fish such as anchovies, shrimp, tuna and mackerel	In midwater trawling a cone-shaped net is towed behind a single boat and spread by trawl doors (image), or it can be towed behind two boats (pair trawling) which act as the spreading device.	Midwater trawling is relatively benign compared to the damage bottom trawling can inflict on the sea bottom.
Plankton net		Plankton	Research vessels collect plankton from the ocean using fine mesh plankton nets. The vessels either tow the nets through the sea or pump sea water onboard and then pass it through the net.	
Purse seine		Schooling fish	The purse seine, widely used by commercial fishermen, is an evolution of the surround net, which in turn is an evolution of the seine net. A large net is used to surround fish, typically an entire fish school, on all sides. The bottom of the net is then closed by pulling a line arranged like a drawstring used to close the mouth of a purse. This completely traps the fish.	Higher chance of bycatch
Push net		Shrimp	A push net is a "small triangular fishing net with a rigid frame that is pushed along the bottom in shallow waters and is used in parts of the southwestern Pacific for taking shrimps and small bottom-dwelling fishes".	
Seine net			A seine is a large fishing net that may be arranged in a number of different ways. In purse seine fishing the net hangs vertically in the water by attaching weights along the bottom edge and floats along the top. A simple and commonly used fishing technique is with beach seine, where the seine net is operated from the shore. Danish seine is a method which has some similarities with trawling. In the UK seine netting for salmon and sea-trout in coastal waters is only permitted in a very few locations and where it is permitted one end of the seine must remain fixed and the other end is then waded out and returns to the fixed point. This variant is called wade netting and is strictly controlled by law.	
Shore-operated lift net		Pelagic species	These are held horizontally by a large fixed structure and periodically lowered into the water. Huge mechanical contrivances hold out horizontal nets with diameters of twenty metres or more. The nets are dipped into the water and raised again, but otherwise cannot be moved. The nets may hold bait or be fitted with lights to attract more fish. The most famous examples are found at Kochi, India, where they are known as Chinese fishing nets (Cheena vala). Despite this name, this technique is used all over the world. They are also widely used on the Atlantic coast of France, where they are operated from small huts built over the water on stilts, known as carrelets, and on the Adriatic coast of Italy as trabucco.	
Surrounding net			A surrounding net surrounds fish on all sides. It is an evolution of the seine, and is typically used by commercial fishers.	
Tangle net			Tangle nets, also known as tooth nets, are similar to gillnets except they have a smaller mesh size designed to catch fish by the teeth or upper jaw bone instead of by the gills.	
Trammel		Demersal species, fish and crustaceans.	A trammel is a fishing net with three layers of netting that is used to entangle fish or crustacea. A slack central layer with a small mesh is sandwiched between two taut outer layers with a much larger mesh. The net is kept vertical by the floats on the headrope and weights on the bottomrope. Floats can be small, cylindrical or egg-shaped, solid and plastic. They are attached on the head rope while weights made up of lead are distributed along the ground rope.	Fishers can lose these nets. This can result in "ghost fishing", with associated loss of marine animals continuing for the remaining life of the net. The net also captures small sized organisms and non-target species. Such impact can be regulated by using larger meshes, however compared to gillnets the selectivity of trammel nets are lower and catches of small organisms and non-target species are common.

== Fishing lines ==
Ropes and lines are made of fibre lengths, twisted or braided together to provide tensile strength. They are used for pulling, but not for pushing. The availability of reliable and durable ropes and lines has had many consequences for the development and utility of fishing nets, and influences particularly the scale at which the nets can be deployed.

- Twine
- Braided fishing line
- Multifilament fishing line
- Monofilament fishing line
- Fishing line
- Manila rope
- Abacá rope

== Floats ==
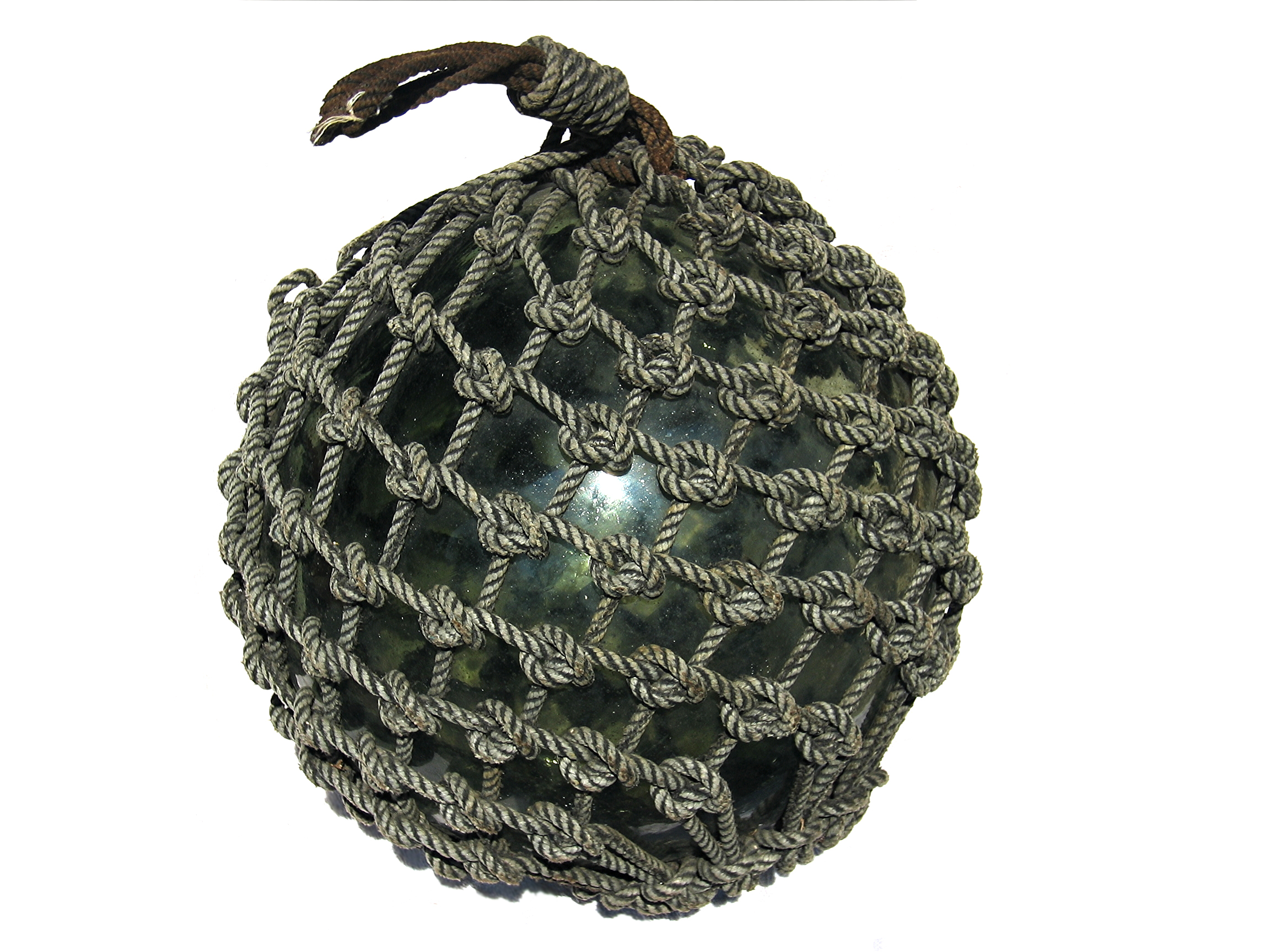
A Japanese glass fishing float

Some types of fishing nets, like seine and trammel, need to be kept hanging vertically in the water by means of floats at the top. Various light "corkwood"-type woods have been used around the world as fishing floats. Floats come in different sizes and shapes. These days they are often brightly coloured so they are easy to see.

- Small floats were usually made of cork, but fishermen in places where cork was not available used other materials, like birch bark in Sweden, Finland, and Russia, as well as the pneumatophores of mangrove apple in Southeast Asia. These materials have now largely been replaced by plastic foam.
- Subsistence fishermen in some areas of Southeast Asia make corks for fishing nets by shaping the pneumatophores of mangrove apple into small floats.
- Across the Indo-Pacific ocean, many subsistence fishermen utilise discarded flip-flops as floats. This is especially common in the Western Indian Ocean on drag nets made from mosquito nets.
- Entelea: The wood was used by Māori for the floats of fishing nets
- Native Hawaiians made fishing net floats from low density wiliwili wood.
- Glass floats were large glass balls for long oceanic nets, now substituted by hard plastic. They were used by fishermen in many parts of the world, not only to keep fishing nets afloat, but also for dropline and longline fishing. Often larger floats have marker flags for easier spotting. Glass floats are now collector's items.
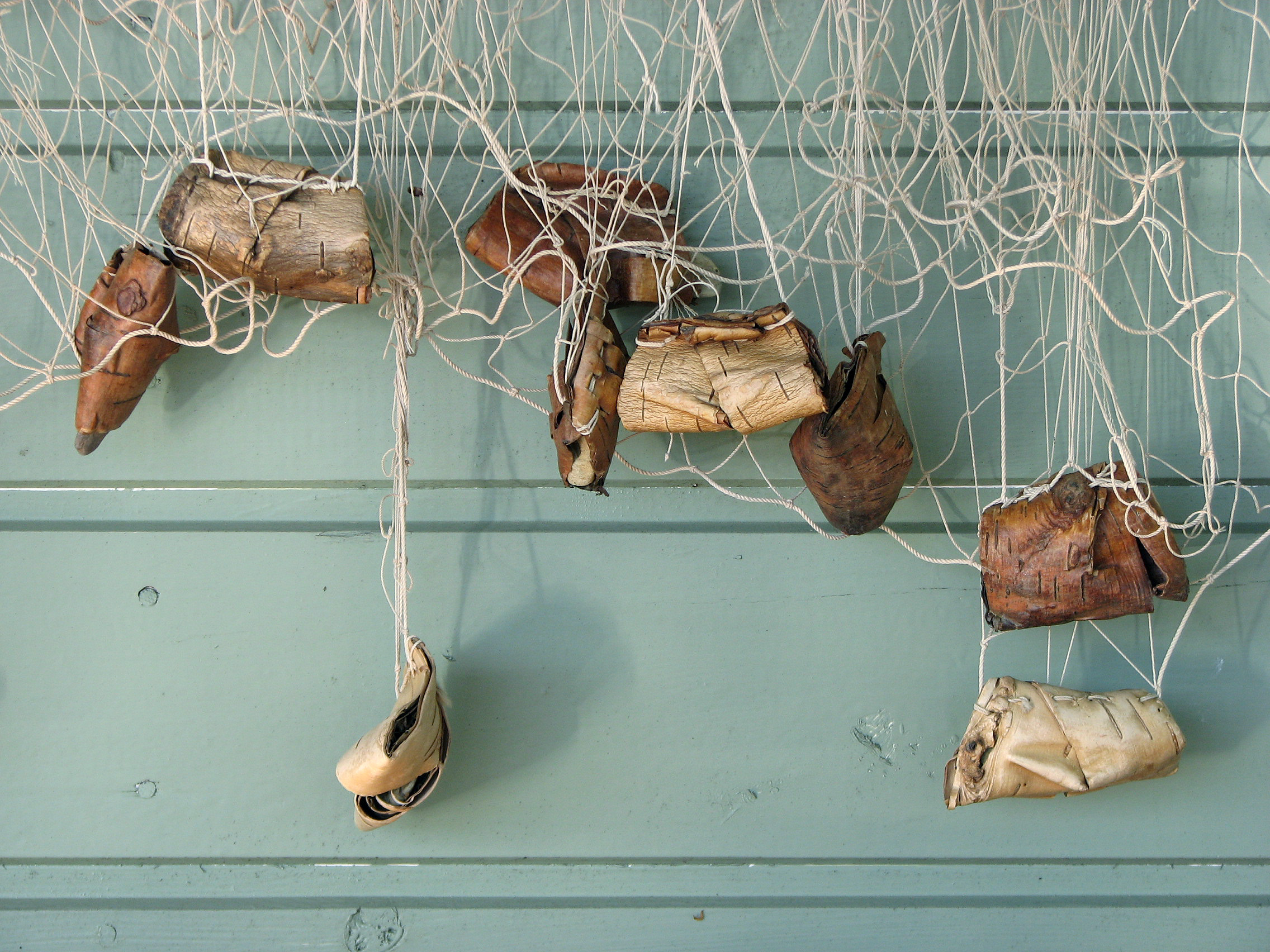
Finnish fishing net corks made out of birch bark and stones

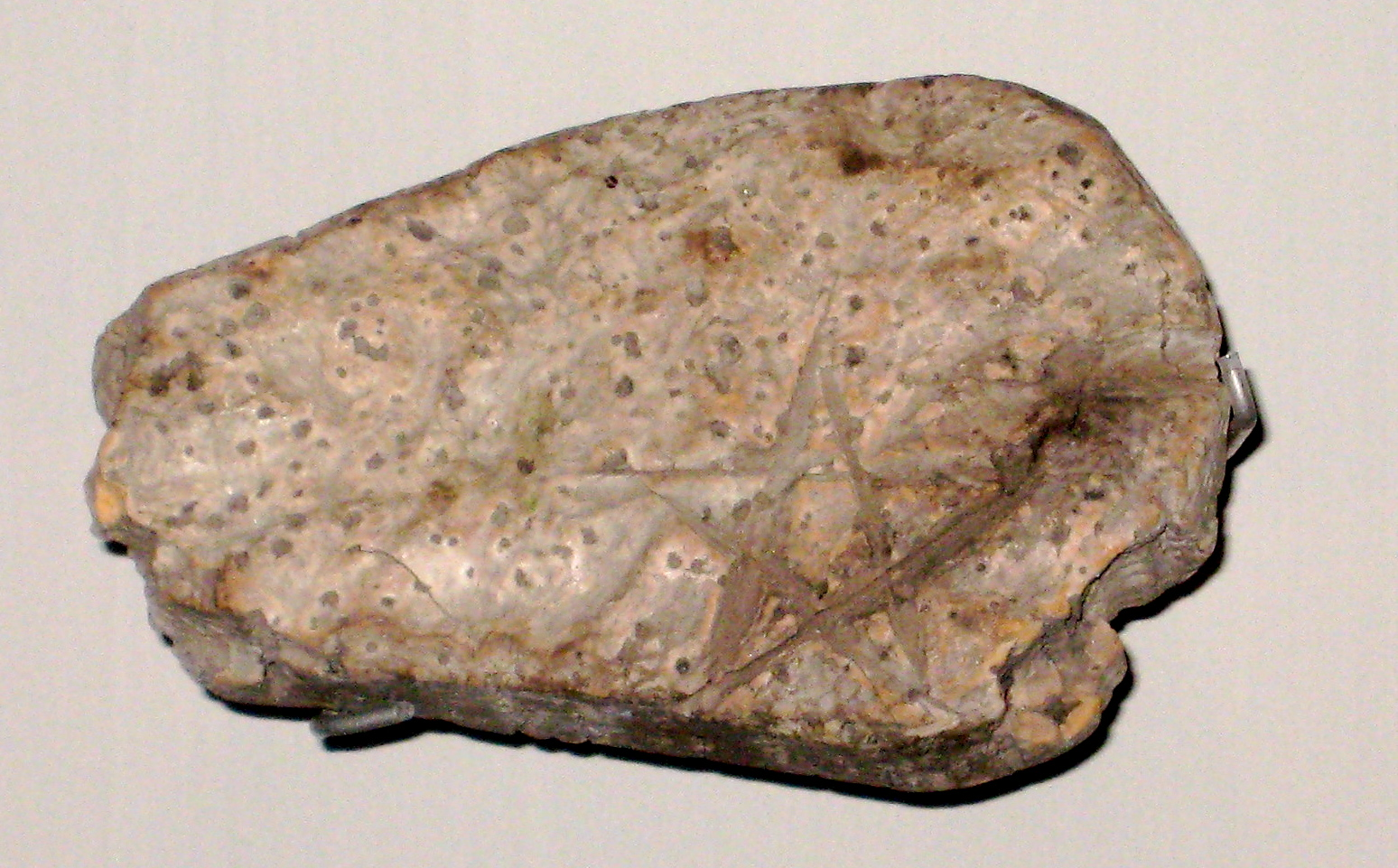
Cork float of a fisher net engraved with a protective pentagram, Hvide Sande, Denmark

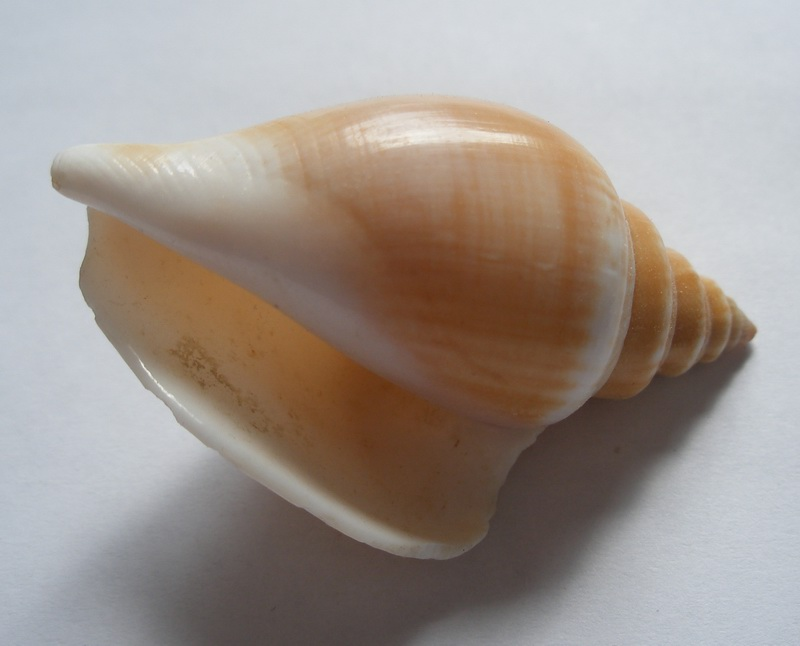
Dog conches are used to weigh down fishing nets.

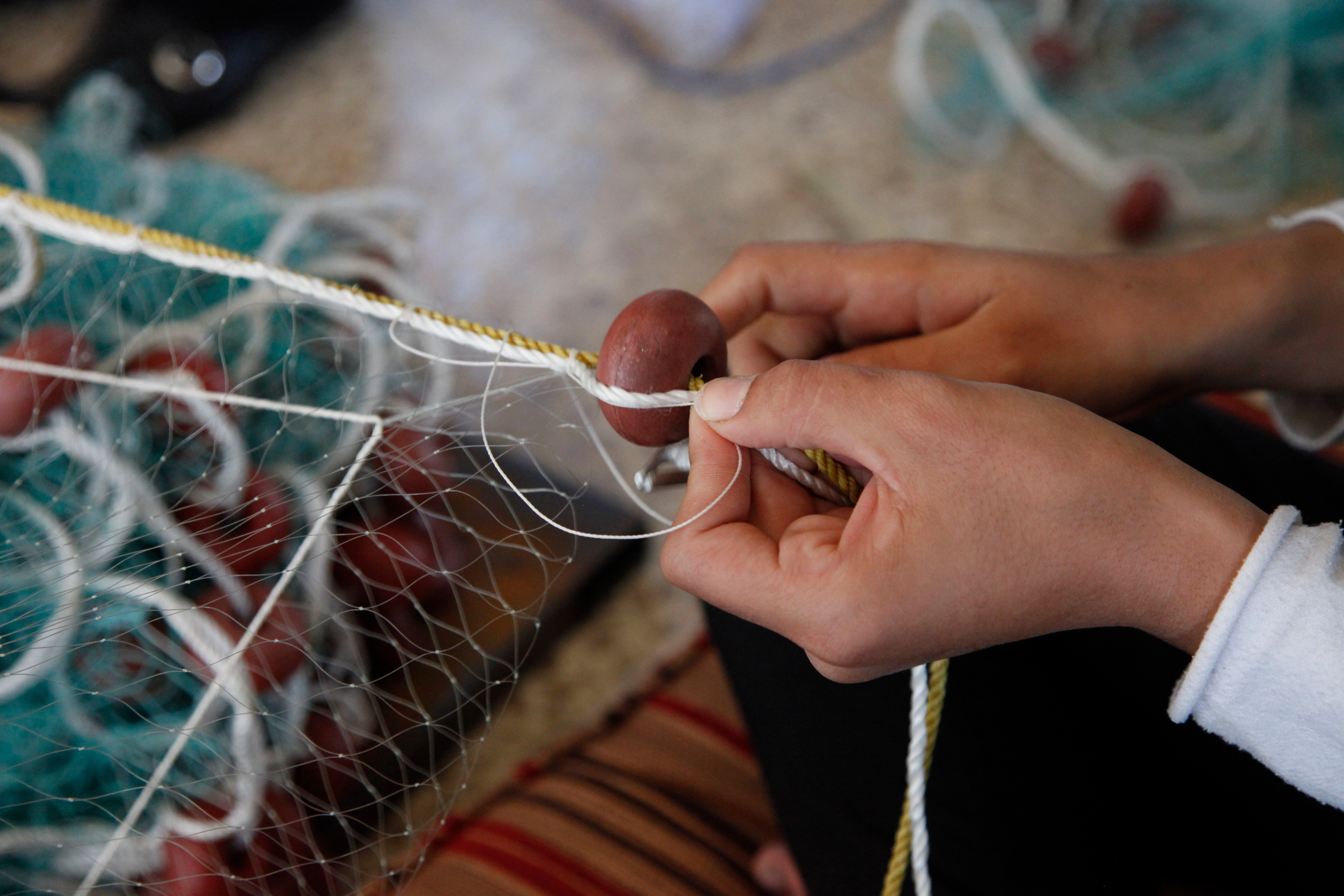
A plastic float being sewn onto a net

== Weights and anchors ==
The Cucuteni–Trypillia culture, c. 5500 BC to 2750 BC in Eastern Europe, created ceramic weights in various shapes and sizes which were used as loom weights when weaving, and also were attached to fishing nets.

Despite their ornamental value, dog conches are traditionally used by local fishermen as sinkers for their fishing nets.

== Production ==
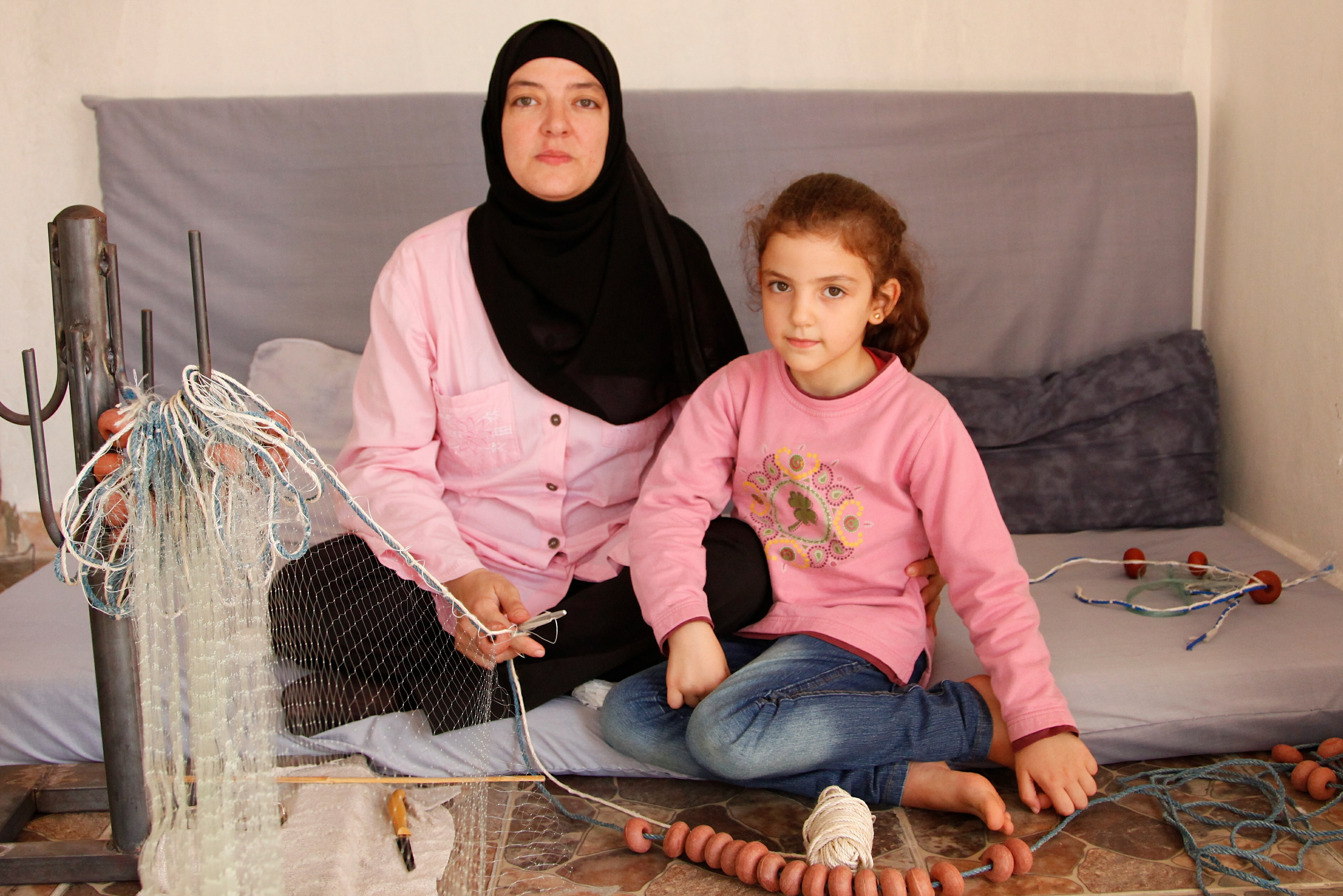
Syrian refugee in Lebanon manually manufacturing from her home a fishing net intended for sale

Fishing nets are usually manufactured on industrial looms, though traditional methods are still used where the nets are woven by hand and assembled in home or cottage industries.

== Environmental impact ==
Fisheries often use large-scale nets that are indiscriminate and catch whatever comes along; sea turtle, dolphin, or shark. Bycatch is a large contributor to sea turtle deaths. Longline, trawl, and gillnet fishing are three types of fishing with the most sea turtle accidents. Deaths occur often because of drowning, where the sea turtle was ensnared and could not come up for air. Cubs of endangered Saimaa ringed seal also drown to fishing nets.

Fishing nets, usually made of plastic, can be left or lost in the ocean by fishermen. Known as ghost nets, these entangle fish, whales, dolphins, sea turtles, sharks, dugongs, crocodiles, seabirds, crabs, and other creatures, restricting movement, causing starvation, laceration and infection, and, in those that need to return to the surface to breathe, suffocation.

French artist and environmentalist Océane Jacob uses recovered fishing nets to create public art sculptures, including PAVONA (Coral Maze), for which she used two tonnes of recycled nets recovered from Swedish waters to recreate a coral reef on land, for visitors to reflect on aquatic ecosystems.

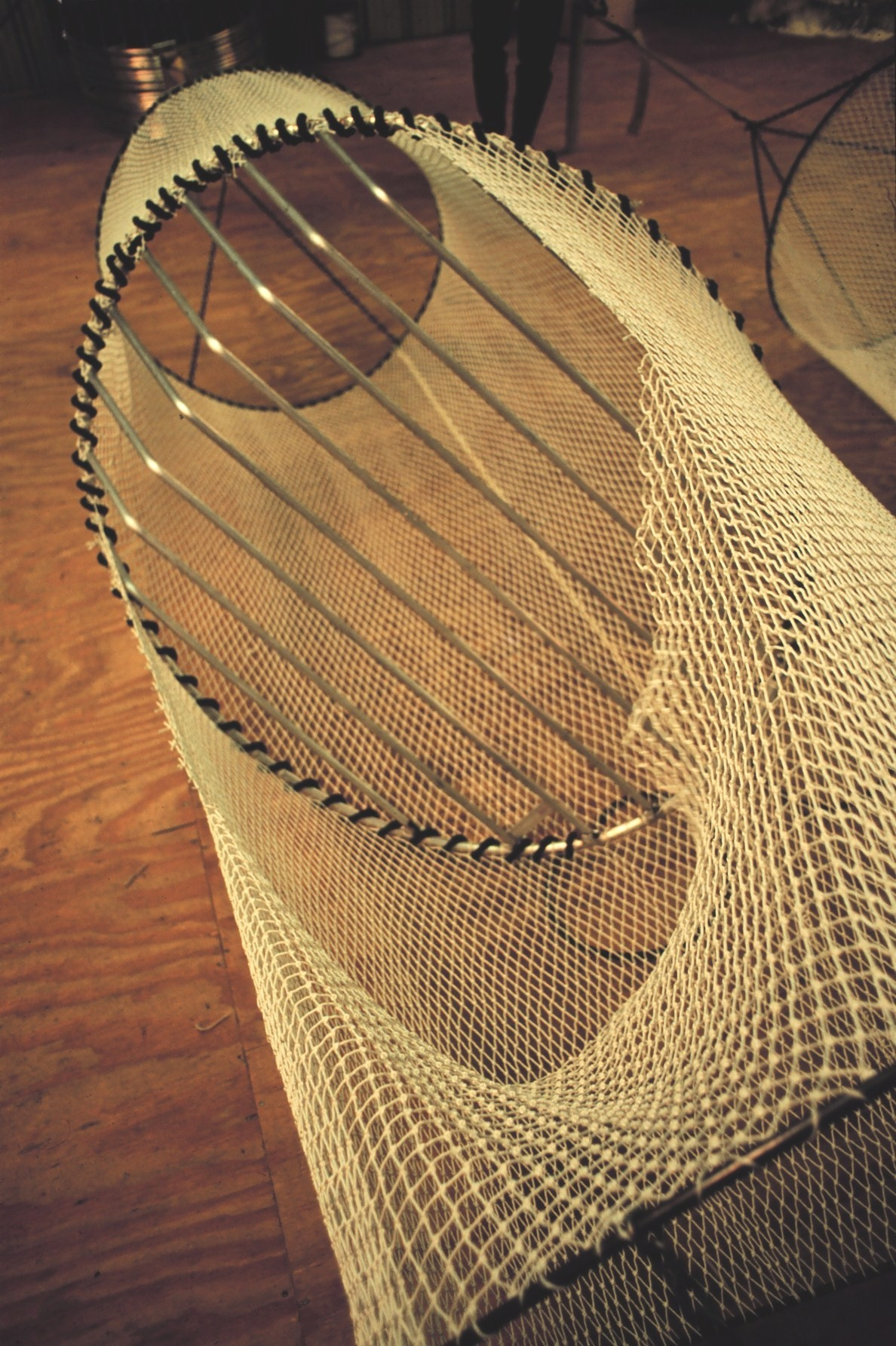
A turtle excluder device (TED)

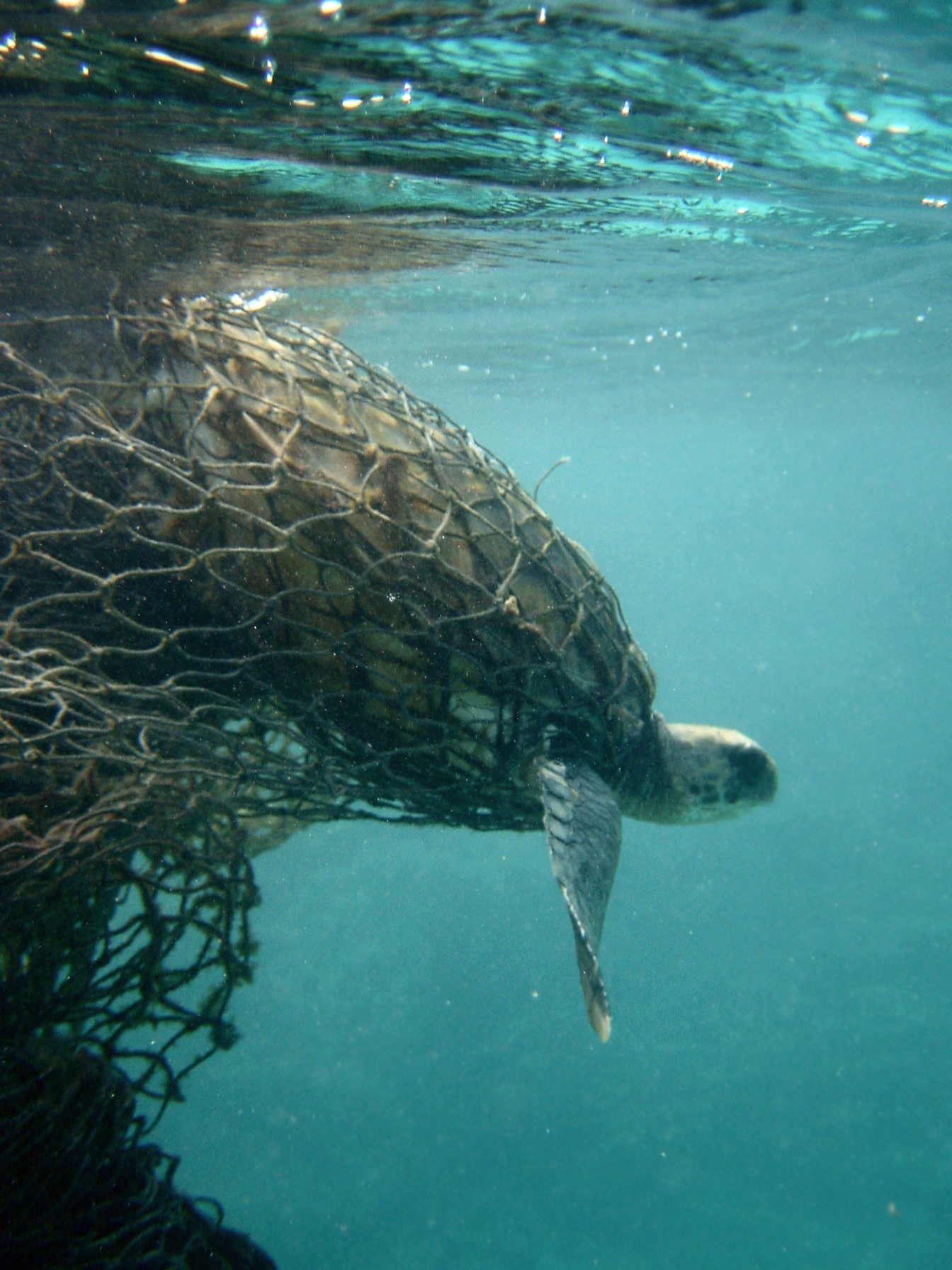
Sea turtle entangled in a net

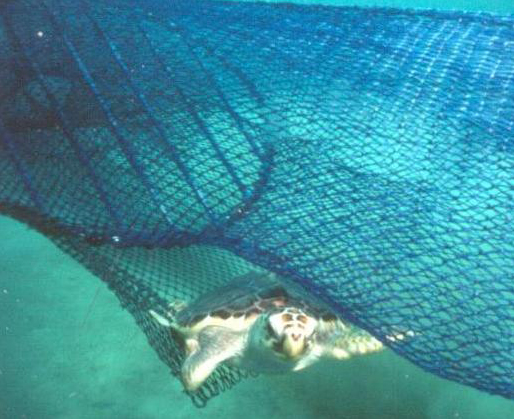
Loggerhead sea turtle exiting from fishing net through a turtle excluder device

== Miscellany ==
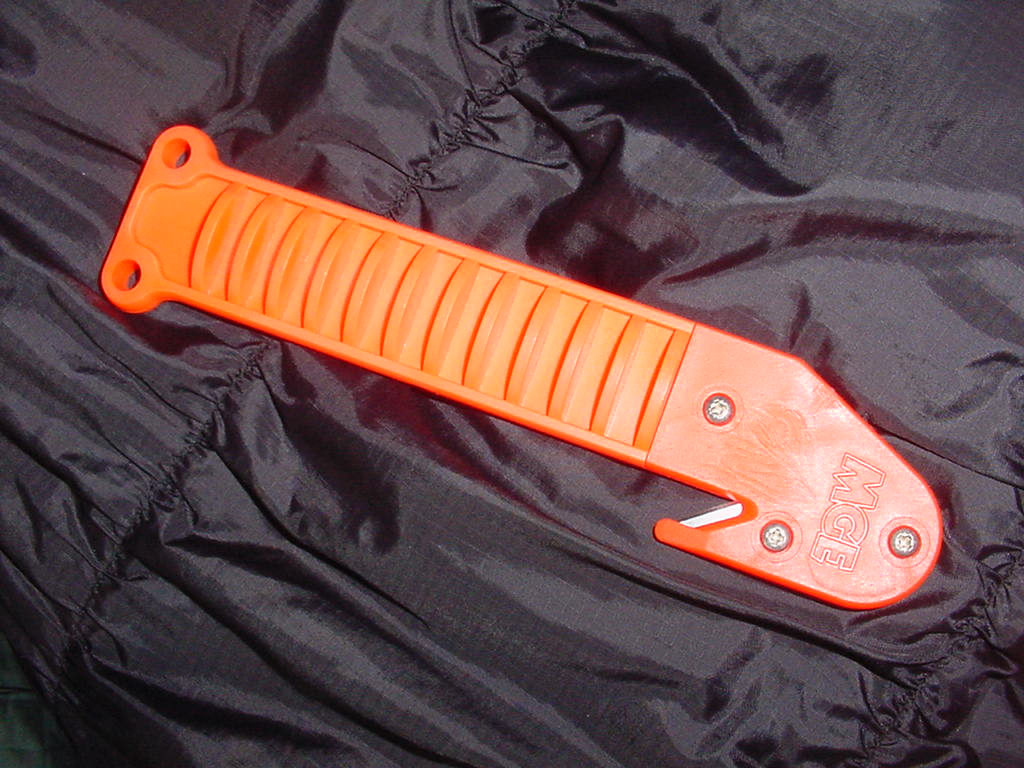
Scuba diver's net cutter

Divers may become trapped in fishing nets; monofilament is almost invisible underwater. Divers often carry a net cutter. This is a small handheld tool carried by scuba divers to extricate themselves if trapped by a fishing net or fishing line. It has a small sharp blade such as a replaceable scalpel blade inside the small notch. There is a small hole at the other end to for a lanyard to tether the cutter to the diver.

== Gallery ==
Fishing nets round the world

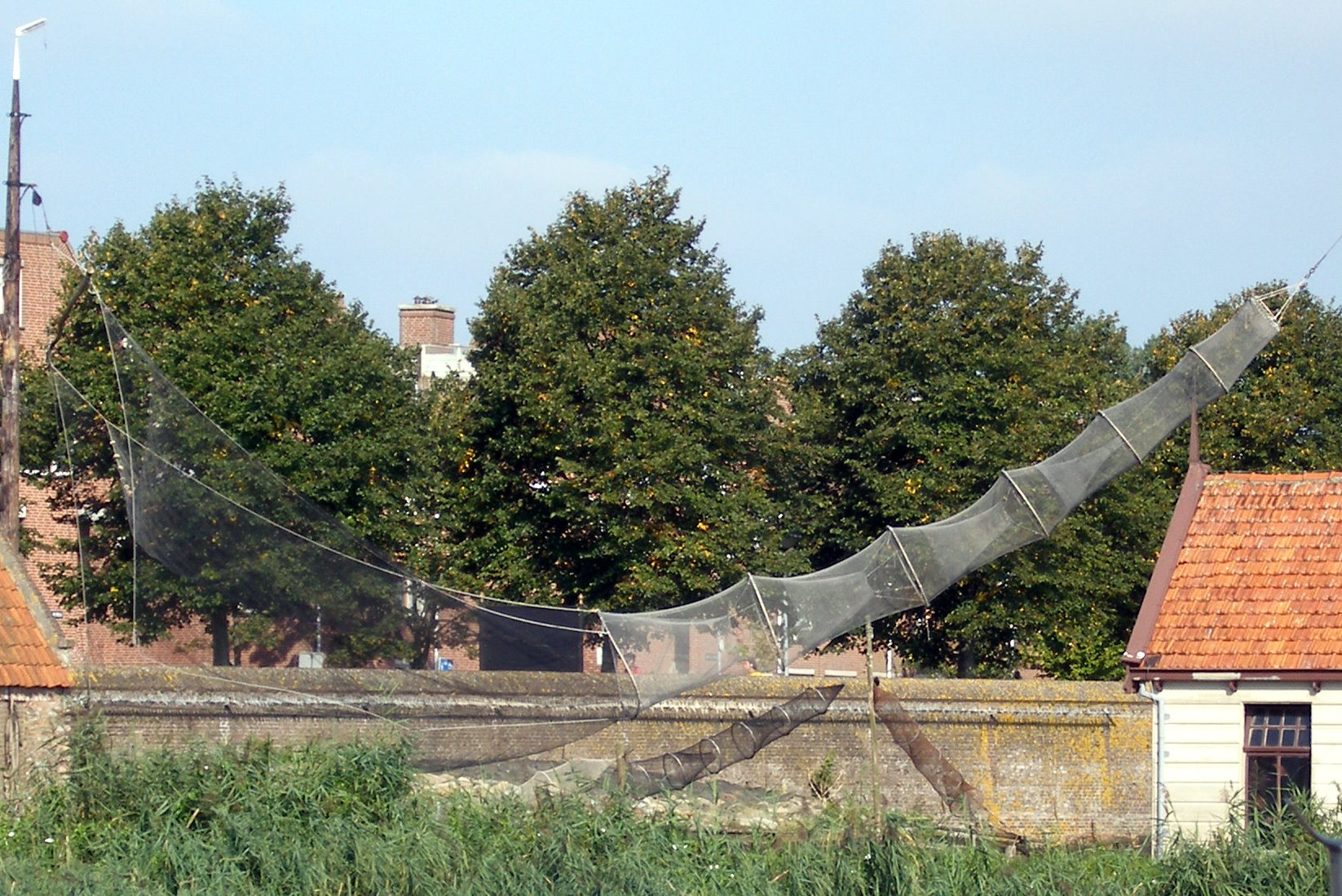
Three fykes at the Zuiderzeemuseum, Netherlands

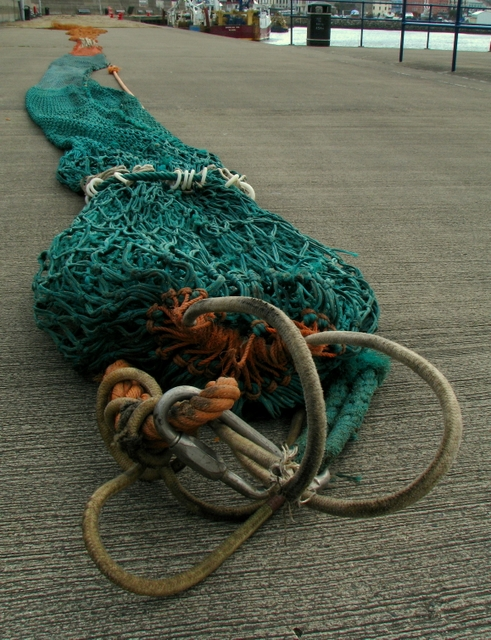
Commercial trawl net, Bangor

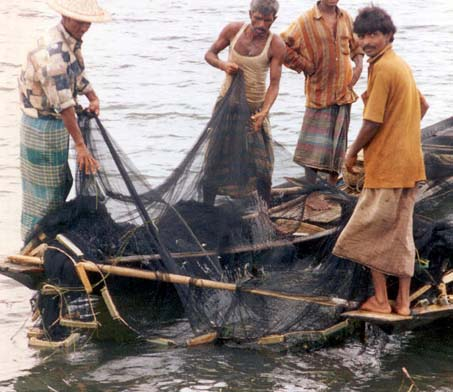
Fishermen in Bangladesh

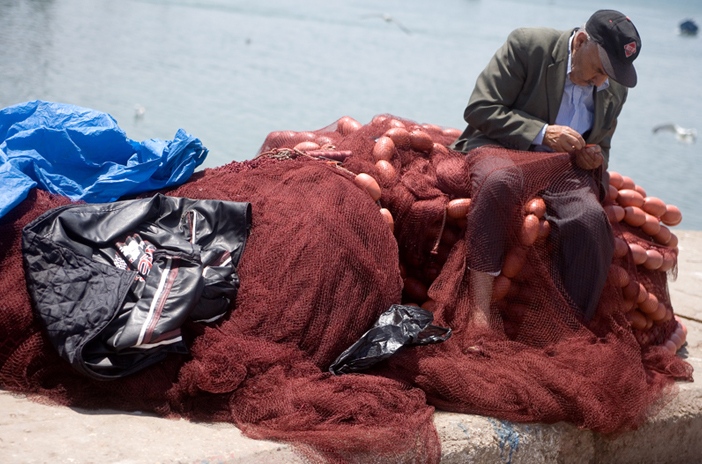
Moroccan fisherman mending his nets

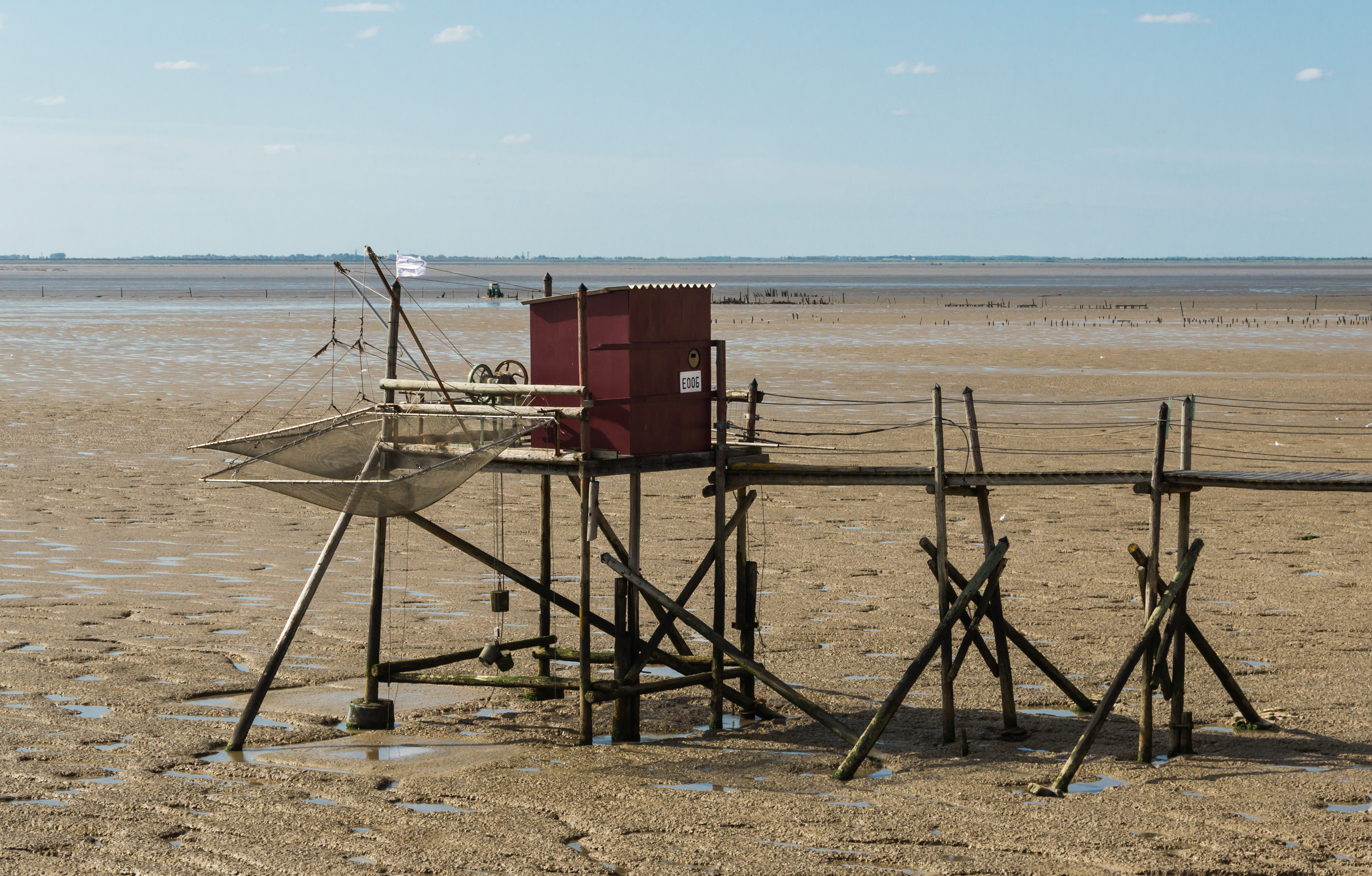
Fishing nets on pontoons

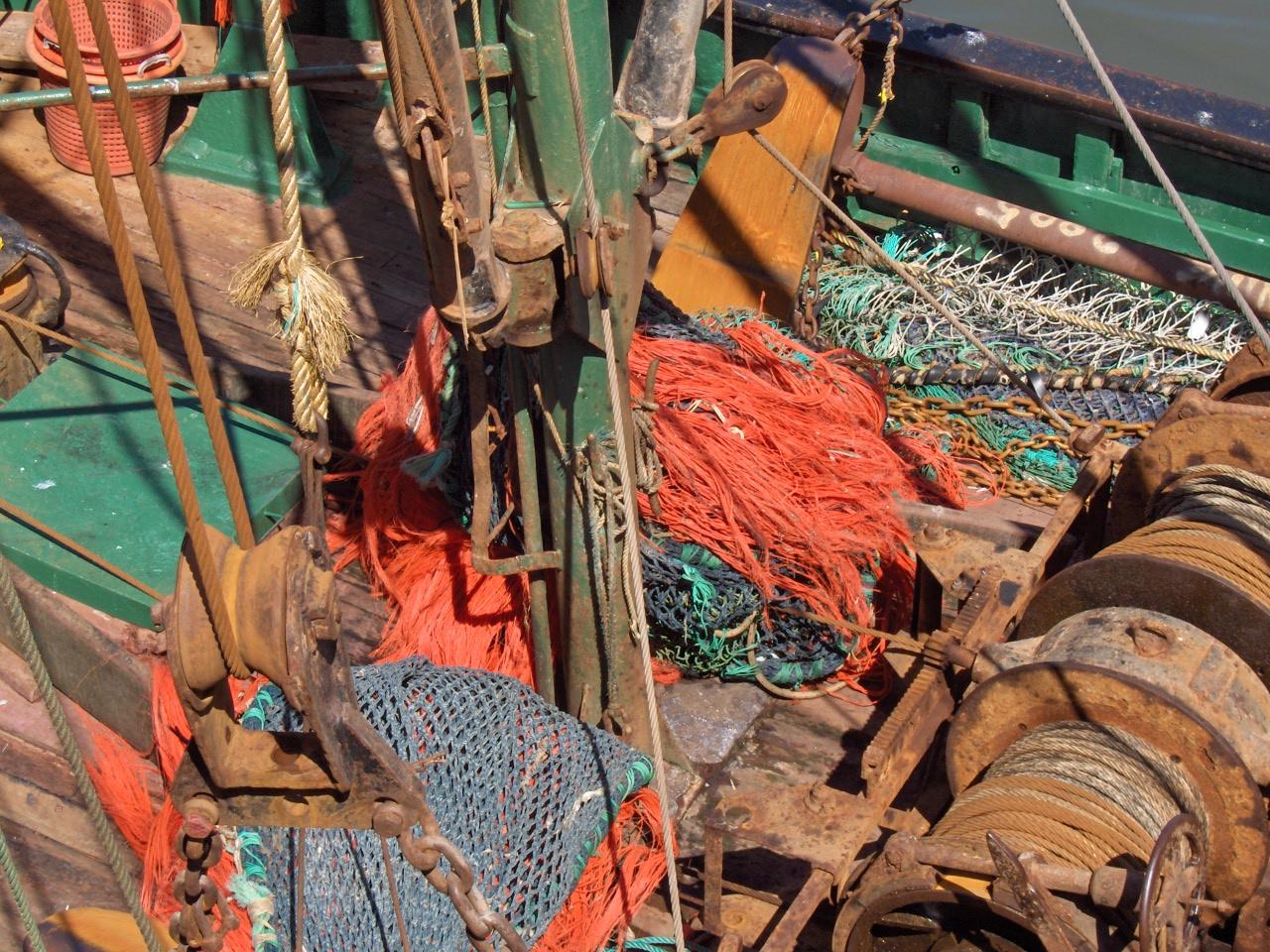
Fishing nets on a shrimp boat, Ostend, Belgium

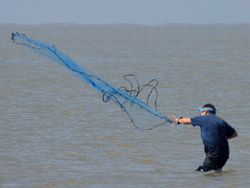
Fishing with a cast net

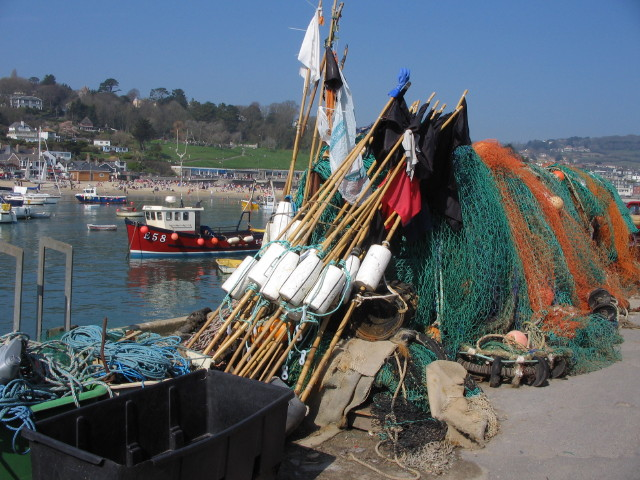
Fishing nets and marker flags used on a small fishing vessel at Lyme Regis, England

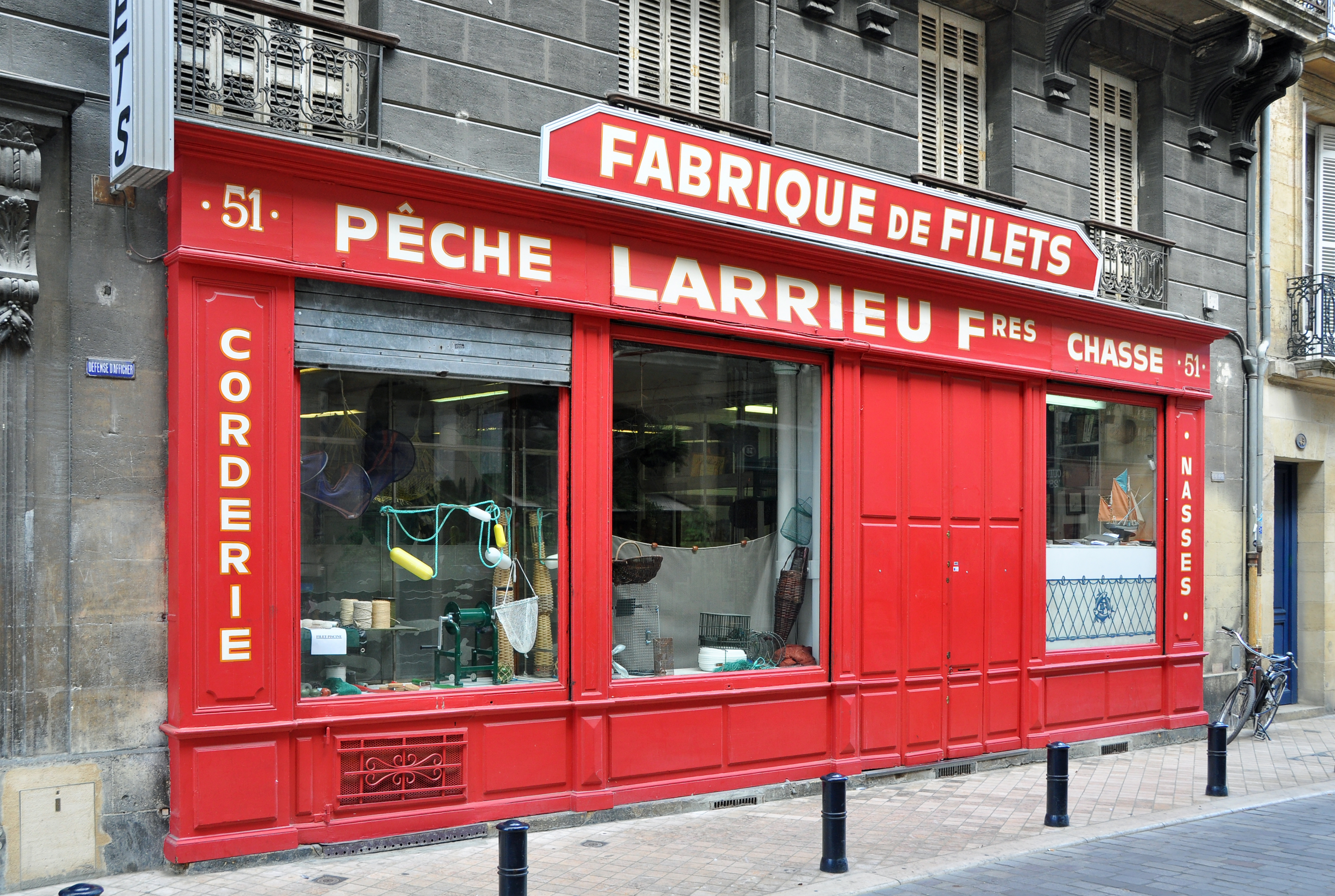
Net manufacturer Larrieu Frères in Bordeaux, France, founded 1622

== See also ==
- Fish trap
- Fishnet (material)
- Miraculous catch of fish
- Mosquito net § Usage
