= Lave net =

Type of fishing net used in estuaries

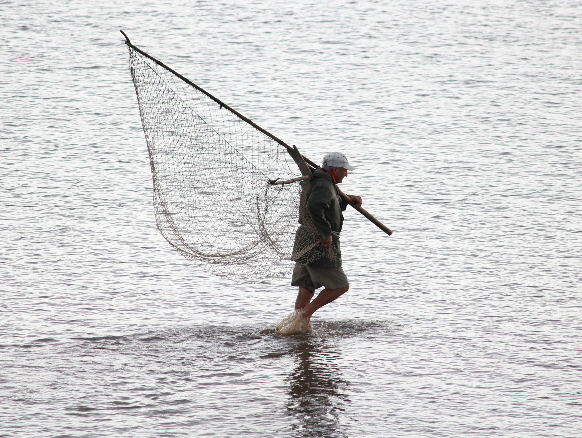
Fisherman carrying a lave net

A lave net is a type of fishing net used in river estuaries, particularly in the Severn Estuary in Wales and England to catch salmon.

The lave net is a Y-shaped structure consisting of two arms called rimes made from willow, which act as a frame work to the loosely hung net. The handle is called the rock staff and is made of ash or willow. The arms are hinged to the rock staff and are kept in position while fishing with a wooden spreader called the headboard.

Fishermen wade out at low tide with lave nets on their shoulders to the fishing grounds, with the water up to their waists. The net is then opened and lowered into the outgoing tide which rushes through the net. With his fingers placed at the bottom meshes of the net, the fisherman then waits for the fish to hit the net.

The last lave net fishermen in Wales promote the fishery as a tourist attraction at Black Rock, Portskewett, with the aim of maintaining its history and tradition. Demonstrations of lave net fishing can be watched on certain days from the picnic site at Black Rock.

There are similarities with haaf net fishing, practised in the Solway Firth, where the fishermen stand waist deep in the water with large oblong nets. However, unlike haaf netters, lave net fishermen move around in the water.

On the English side of the Severn, lave net fishing was practised for centuries at Oldbury on Severn. In the 1990s the fishery declined because the fishing stations silted up, claimed by the fishermen to be a result of slower tides caused by the construction of the Second Severn Crossing.

In the past, sturgeon have also been caught in lave nets.

== See also ==
Putcher fishing
