= Antrea Net =

Prehistoric fishing net found in Russia

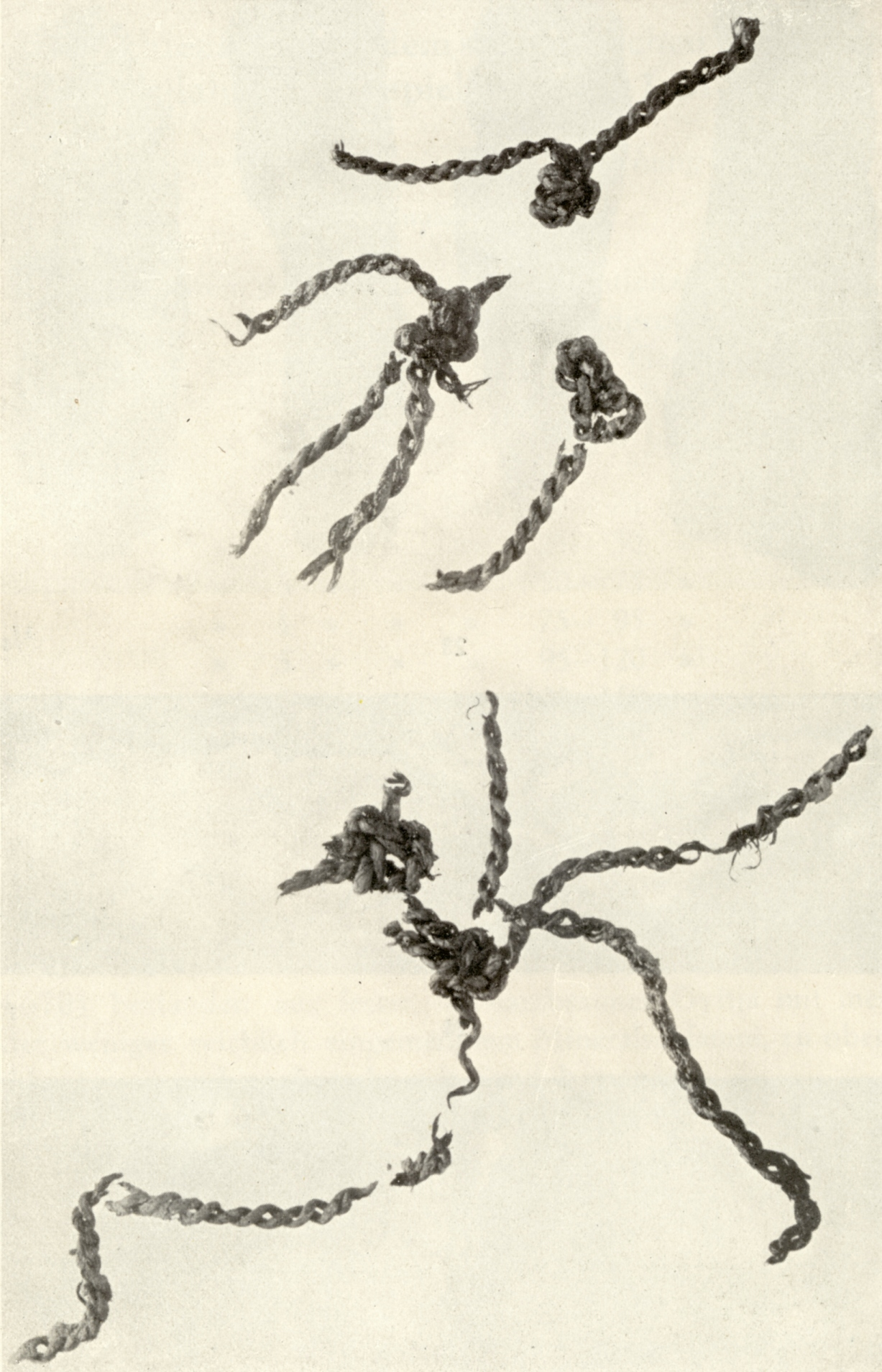
- Pieces of the Antrea Net
- Material: Willow
- Created: c. 8,540 BC
- Discovered: 1913; Antrea, Grand Duchy of Finland, Russian Empire
- Discovered by: Antti Virolainen

The Antrea Net is one of the oldest known fishing nets in the world, found in 1913 in the village of Korpilahti on the Karelian isthmus in Antrea, then in Finland but now belonging to Russia. It is dated to 8540 BCE.

== Discovery ==
The net was found by farmer Antti Virolainen in Antrea, Finland (today Kamennogorsk, Russia) in autumn of 1913 at his home farm Ämmä-Mattila. While he was ditching a swamp meadow, he found several stone and bone objects which got his attention.

== Excavation ==
The site was excavated by the Finnish archaeologist Sakari Pälsi in July 1914. In his excavation, Pälsi found 18 bobbers and 31 net weights and parts of the net. He also found several stone and bone objects, some birchbark and pieces of tinder fungus. All the items were found in a relatively small area, and they had likely come to the scene at the same time in one piece. The items were sunk to the bottom clay of the Ancylus Lake that existed during that period.

== Description ==
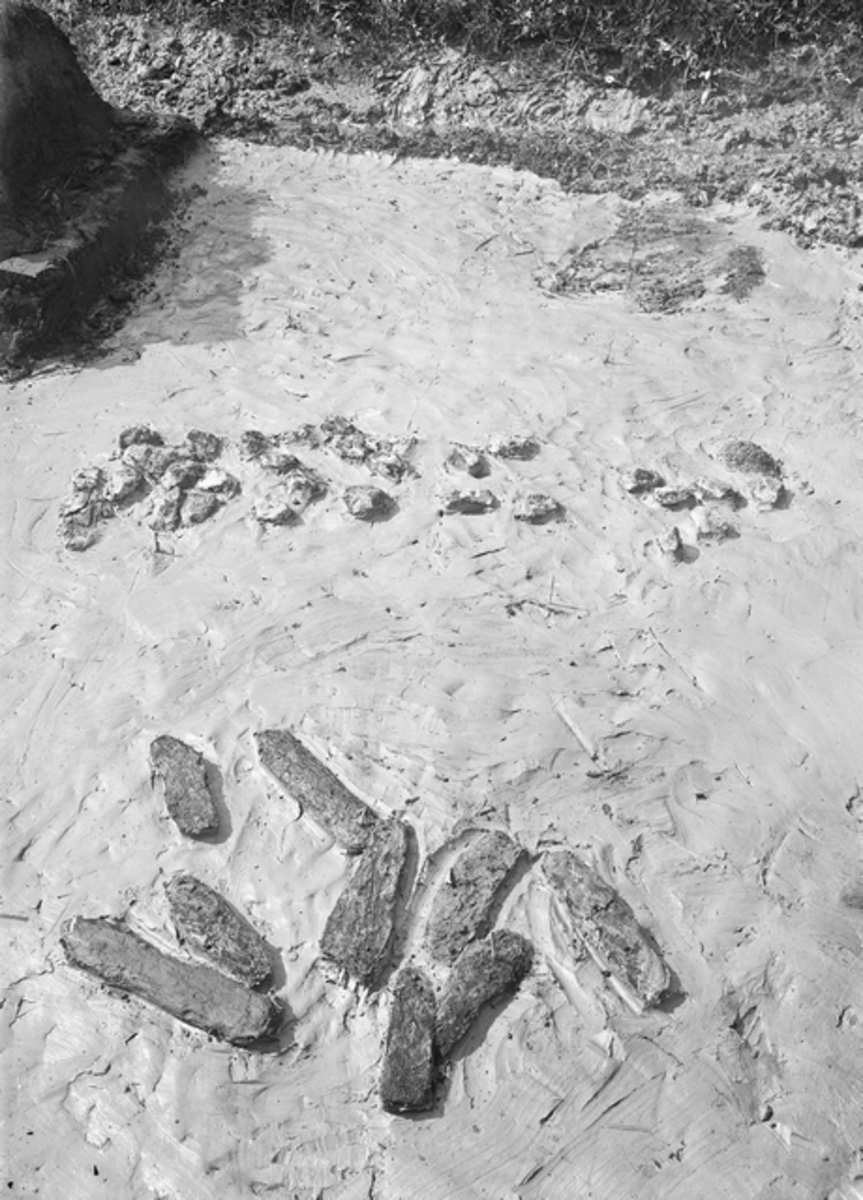
Photo from the excavations of the Antrea Net by Sakari Pälsi in the summer of 1914. The photo shows the bobbers on the front and the netweights on the background.

The net is made out of willow and it is estimated -- based on the number of parts found -- to have been roughly 27 to 30 metres (89 to 98 ft) long by 1.3–1.5 metres (4 ft 3 in – 4 ft 11 in) metres wide, with a 6 cm (2.4 in) mesh. The size of the mesh is suitable for fishing salmon and common bream. The net is laced with a knot called Ryssänsolmu, which was in use until much later dates in Estonia and areas of Baltic Finns.

== Additional sources ==
- Miettinen, Arto; Kaarina Sarmaja-Korjonen; Eloni Sonninen; Högne Junger; Terttu Lempiäinen; Kirsi Ylikoski; Jari-Pekka Mäkiaho & Christian Carpelan (January 2008). "The palaeoenvironment of the 'Antrea Net Find'". Iskos (Journal of the Finnish Antiquarian Society). 16: 71–87.
