= Fish stringer =

Fishing tool

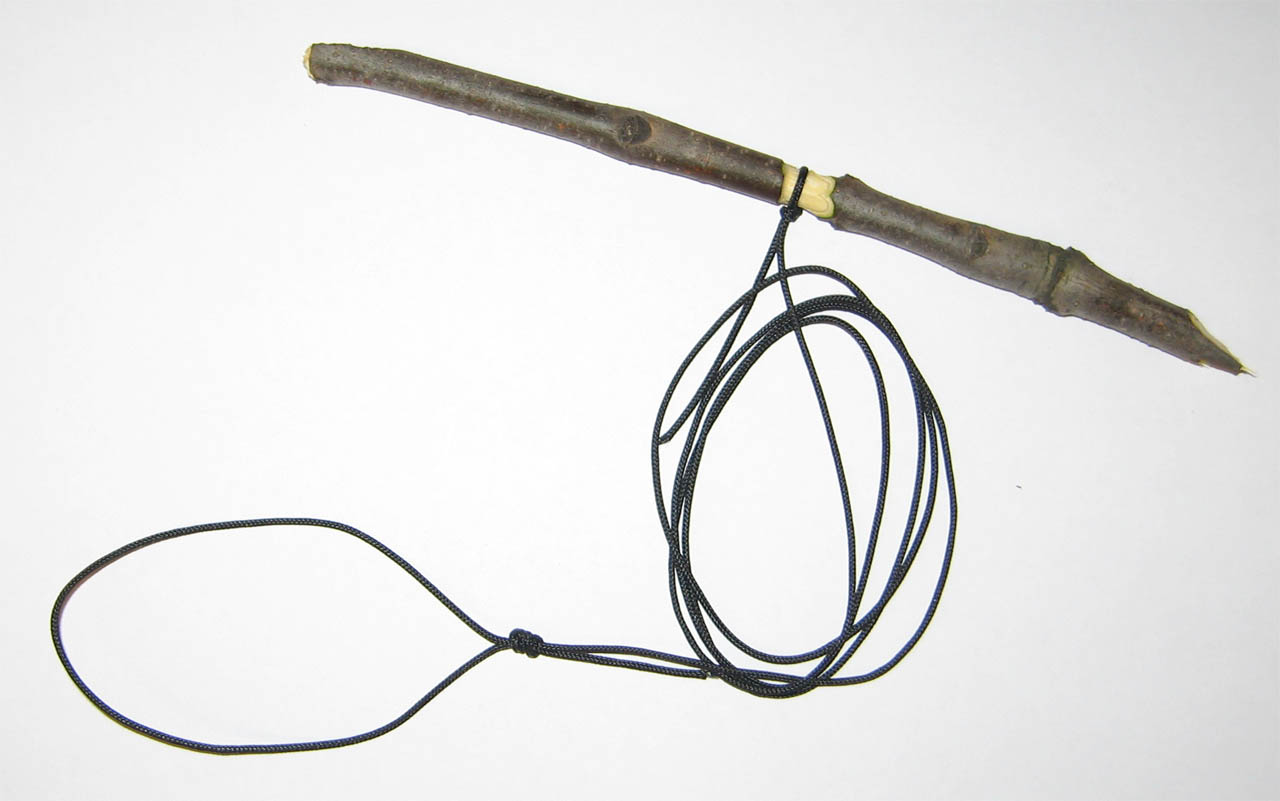
Simple rope stringer for spearfishing

A fish stringer is a line of rope or chain along which a fisherman can string fish so they can be immersed and kept alive in water.

A rope stringer is the simplest type of fish stringer. It consists of a line of rope or wire with a stringing needle made of metal or hardwood at one end. The other end usually has a removable wire ring which can be used to secure the stringer. Using the needle, the stringer is threaded through the fish gill and out through its mouth, or better, it is threaded through the upper and lower lips which allows the fish to breathe freely though its gills.

Chain stringers are made of chain, and have safety-pin snaps strung along the length which can be clipped onto the fish. Whether fishing from the shore or from a boat, the strung fish can be held in the sea (or lake, pond or river) so they stay alive until the fisherman has finished fishing and is ready to take it home.
