= Haaf net fishing =

Ancient British fishing technique

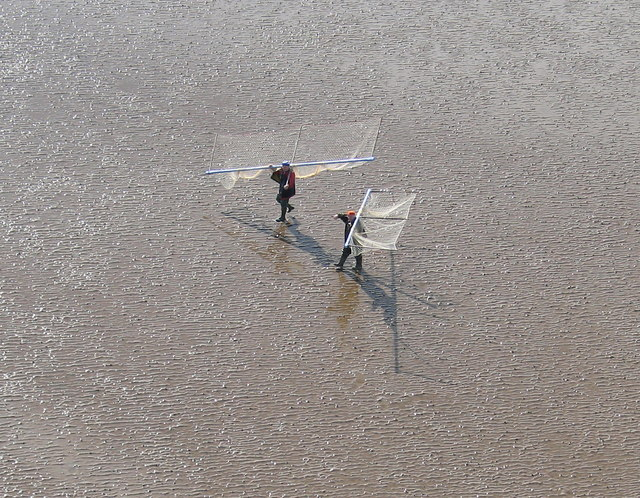
Haaf net fishermen walking out across the mudflats to fish in the Solway Firth

Haaf net fishing is an ancient type of salmon and sea trout net fishing practised in Britain, and is particularly associated with the Solway Firth, the estuary forming part of the border between England and Scotland. The technique involves fishermen standing chest-deep in the sea and using large submerged framed nets to scoop up fish that swim towards them. It is a form of fishing that is believed to have been brought to Britain by the Vikings more than a thousand years ago and to have been practised in the Solway Firth since then.

The number of haaf net fishermen has dwindled over the last 50 years and the activity has been restricted by salmon conservation measures. The haaf net fishing community has campaigned for exemptions from these restrictions and for protection as an ancient cultural activity.

== Etymology and history ==
Haaf net fishing is a type of salmon and sea trout fishing which is practised in South West Scotland and North West England. The word haaf is derived from the Old Norse for “open sea”. The technique has its origins in the Viking Age. It is believed to have been brought to Scotland by the Vikings around 900 A.D. In the 1870s, one of the government's Inspectors of Salmon Fisheries, Spencer Walpole, reported that haaf net fishing was taking place in the estuaries of the Lune and Ribble in Lancashire, and in the Severn Estuary in South West England.

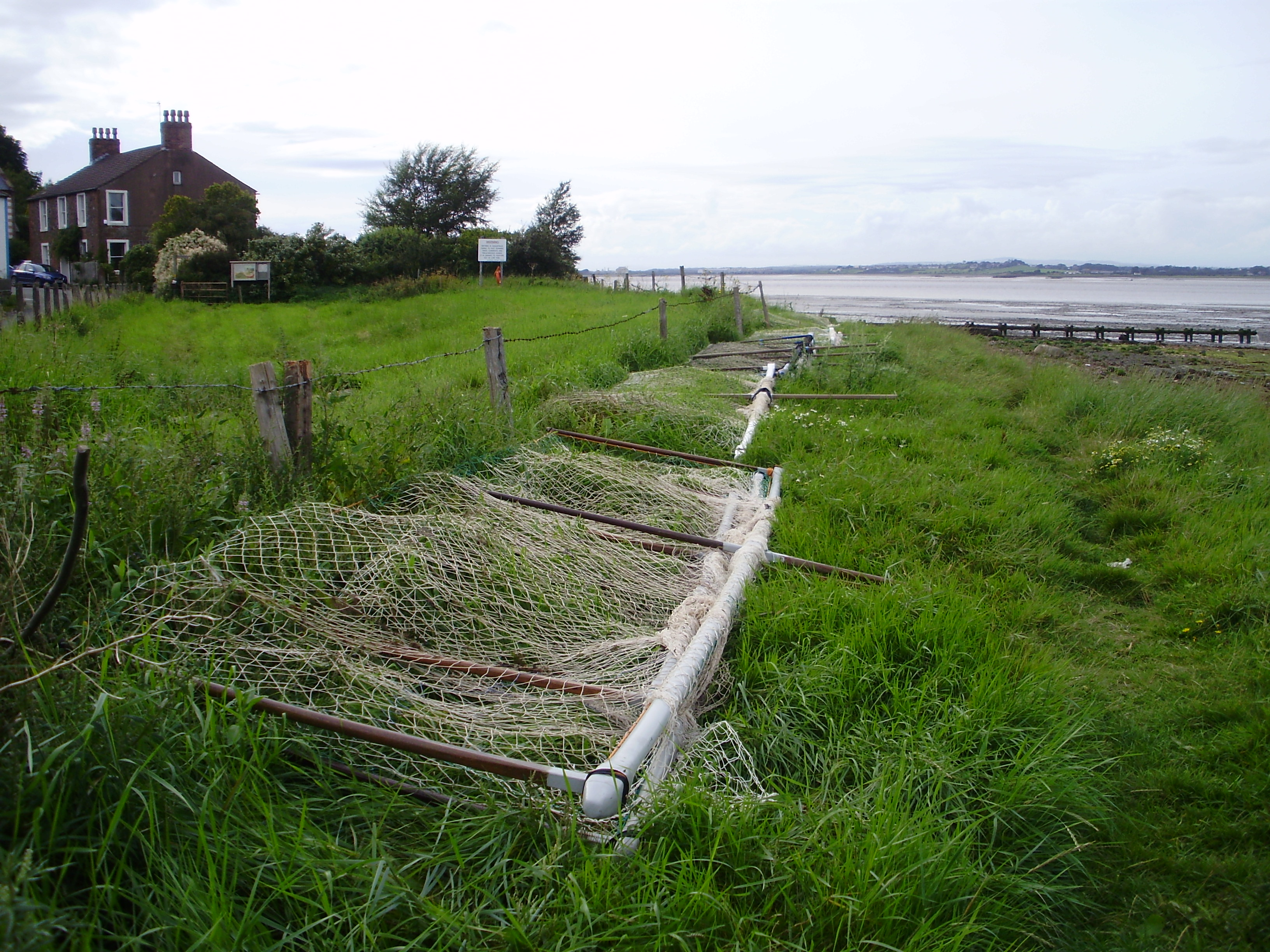
Haaf fishing nets

Haaf net fishing is now unique to the Solway Firth, where it has been practised for over a thousand years. There are similarities with lave net fishing, practised in the Severn estuary, where the fishermen stand waist deep in the water with large Y-shaped nets. However, unlike lave netters, haaf net fishermen remain stationary in the water.

In the 1970s, there were over 100 haaf net fishermen based in towns such as Annan or Gretna making a good living. From the 1980s, the economics of fishing with haaf nets meant that numbers have significantly reduced with only 30 individuals currently practising the technique.

On the Scottish side of the Firth, since 2016, the Scottish Government has introduced salmon conservation measures resulting in haaf net fishermen being required to release alive any salmon they catch. The English side of the Firth is regulated by the Environment Agency which, after a consultation process, introduced similar restrictions in 2018.

As a consequence, the Solway’s haaf net community believes the survival of their traditions is threatened and is seeking exemptions from these requirements and official recognition that haaf netting should be protected as a culturally important and historic activity. In response, Marine Scotland, the Scottish Government agency responsible for fish conservation, has said that the issue is that the salmon stocks of the Firth of Solway feed into rivers with differing levels of salmon sustainability and some of the rivers have low levels. Because the Firth is therefore classified as a “mixed stock fishery”, they cannot permit retention of any salmon caught.

== Equipment and technique ==
The net used has the appearance of a giant butterfly net. It is set in a rectangular wooden frame usually about 4–5 metres (13–16 ft) long and 2 metres (6.6 ft) wide supported by three legs. A central pole extends from one of the longer edges at a right angle.

Haaf net fishing is practised by the fishermen wading out into the sea. In the Solway Firth, this can mean walking out over mudflats for up to one mile. Once in the sea, they position themselves and wait for the tide to ebb or flood. The depth of the water can be up to chest height.

The technique involves the haaf net being submerged in the water, while the fisherman holds it upright with the central pole. When a salmon swims into the net the fisherman tilts the pole backwards to scoop the net upwards, thereby trapping the fish. The fisherman then kills the fish by clubbing it.
