= Gladiator Mosaic =

Ancient mosaic of gladiators in Galleria Borghese

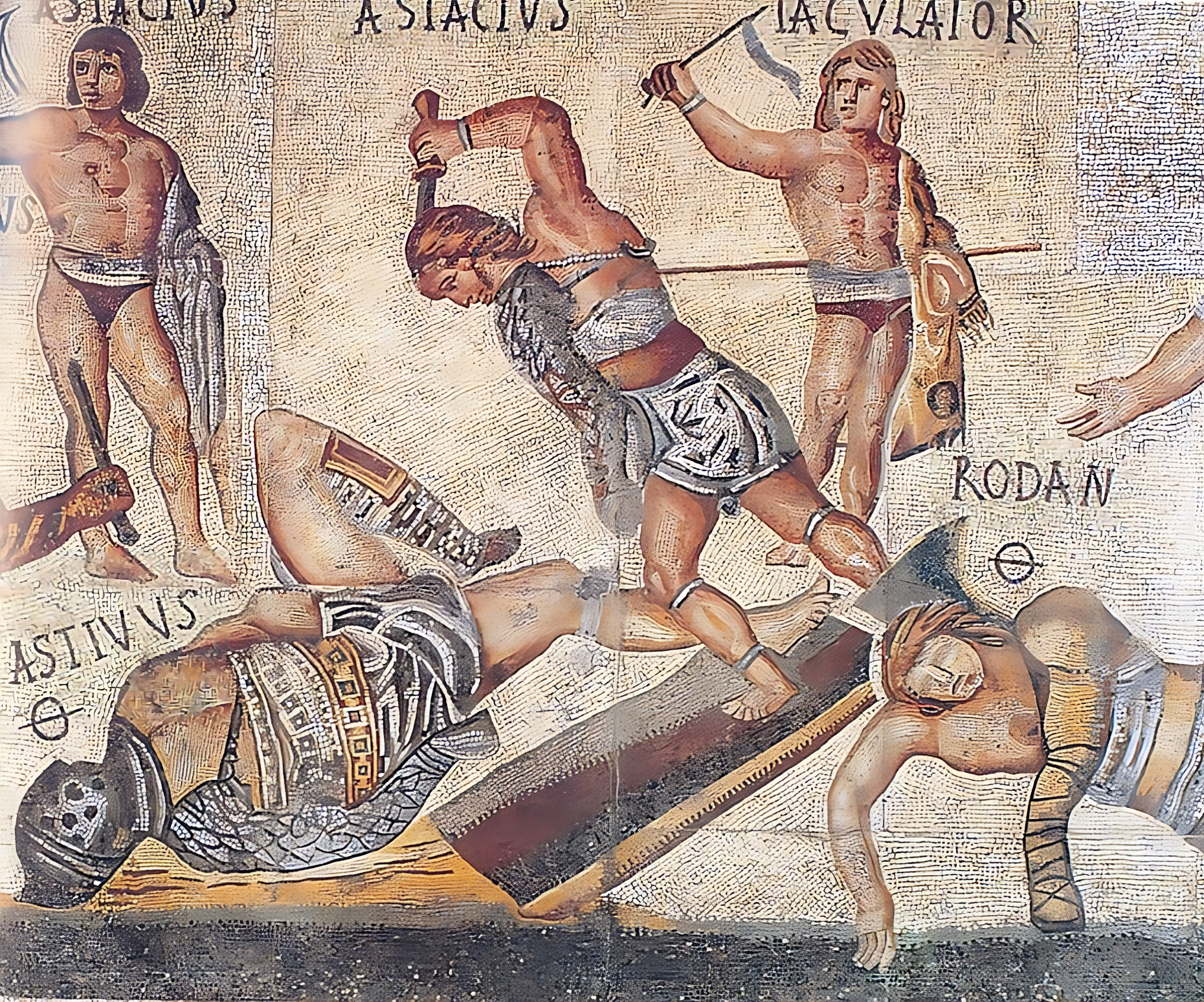
- detail of the mosaic
- Type: Floor mosaics
- Material: Tesserae (stone and glass)
- Created: First half of 4th century AD
- Discovered: 1834; Borghese estate, Torrenova, Via Casilina, Rome, Italy
- Present location: Galleria Borghese, Salone, Rome, Italy
- Culture: Roman

The Gladiator Mosaic is a famous set of 5 large mosaics of gladiators and venators and two smaller ones. The mosaics are dated to the first half of the 4th century and are now installed in the Salone of the Galleria Borghese in Rome. They were discovered in 1834 on the Borghese estate at Torrenova, on the Via Casilina outside Rome. Prince Francesco Borghese Aldobrandini requested the excavations be completed. It is believed to have decorated a cryptoporticus of an inner peristylum for a large domus. The mosaics were removed from excavations and restored by Gaetano Ruspi and Filippo Scaccia in 1839. These panels reinvigorated the Borghese Collection after it had shrunk following the sale of much of the collection to Napoleon I.

== Description ==
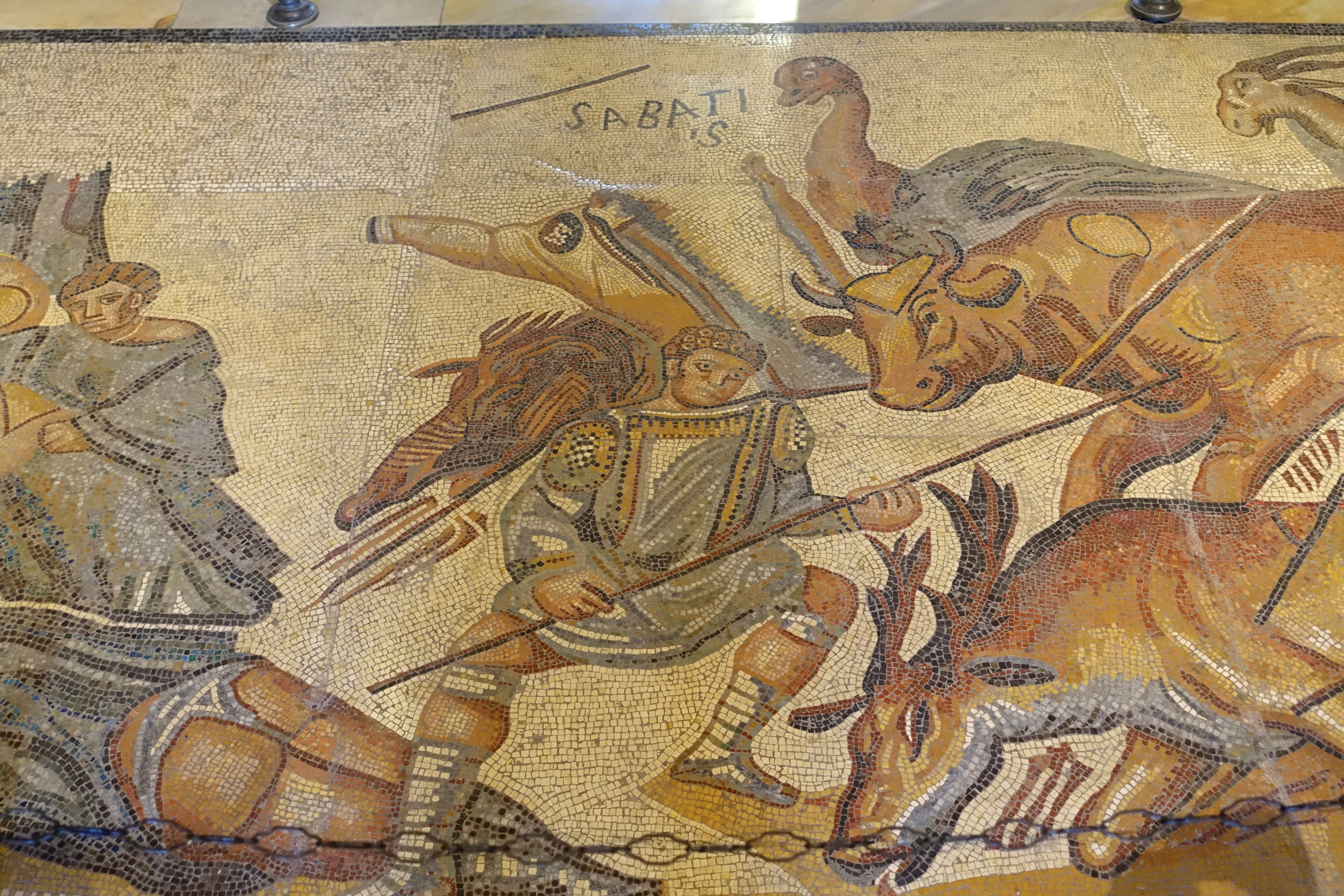
Detail of venatio with Sabatius Inscription

The mosaic depicts a single narrative of munera and venationes similar to the celebratory events a wealthy person would host in their domus at the time. These events replaced the public spectacles of the Late Republic and Early Empire during which the virtues of the sponsor of the event would be exalted. The names of many gladiators are given in an inscription next to the figures, some with the Greek letter Θ, an abbreviation for θάνατος "dead", for those who died in combat and others with vic[it], an abbreviation of the Latin word for "[he] wins", for the winners. Many of the figures are depicted wearing highly decorated tunics and subligacula, adorned with little circles or contrasting lines, or shown with streaks of gray tesserae to indicate the flow of the garment.

Panel 1 (Note: The panel number refers to the demarcation by the Galleria Borghese on their website.) shows a group of seven men, of which six have been injured, facing a bull next to a pair of venatores facing a bull, an ostrich, an elk, a deer, and a lion, with one of the men piercing it with a spear. On this panel the name Sabatius is recorded, although the figure is partially destroyed. Panel 2 shows two bestiarii along with eight panthers on two different levels of the mosaic, indicating depth. Under the figures are lines indicating the arena. One of the bestiarius is identified by the name Melitio. The arrangement of the figures in this panel seems to indicate ancient restorations.

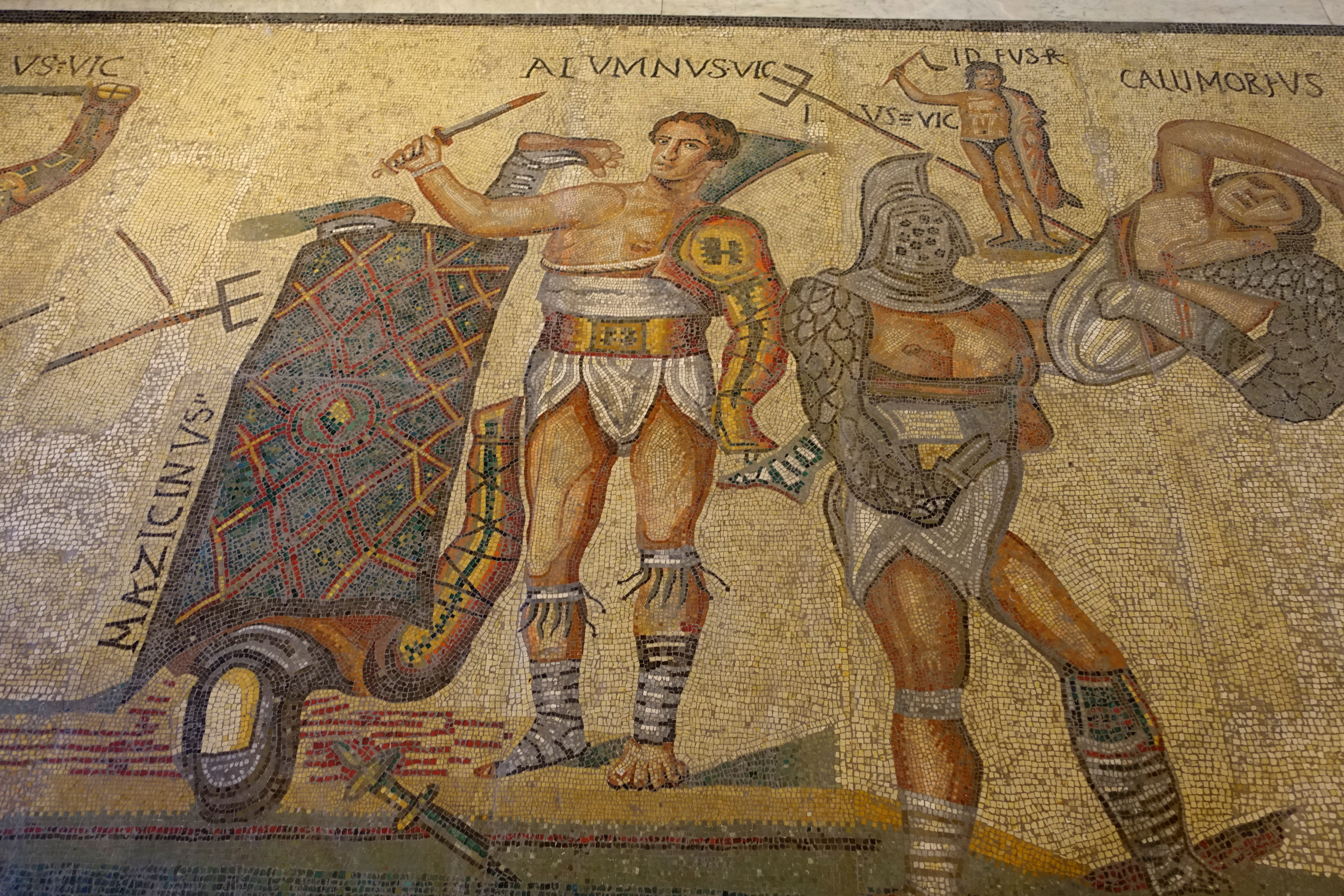
Detail of Mazicinus and Alumnus fight on Panel 3

On Panel 3, the viewer can see four different gladiatorial pairings. A secutor kills a missing figure, another secutor, Mazicinus, is struck by the retiarius Almunus, an hoplomachus fatally wounds the retiarius, Callimorfus, and finally a smaller gladiator or incitator named Ideus, appears in the upper register. On the far right of this panel two pairs of bestiarii, one named Serpeniius, are fighting panthers. This panel is notable for its vivid depictions of the gladiators. The fight scene between Alumnus and Mazicianus is highly decorative. Alumnus is shown wearing a multicolor sleeve and a subligaculum shaded with gray streaks brandishing a dagger that has been created using red tessera for the blood. Mazicianus is lying dead under his highly stylized shield with a network of red and yellow lines. Callimorfus is artistically depicted as having been mortally wounded in the chest dropping his dagger with a pained expression on his face while the victorious hoplomachus, whose name is only preserved with a "-us", towers over him.

Panel 4 displays four pairs of gladiators fighting with three incitatores. The role of the incitator is to urge the enslaved fighters who may not be engaging in the bloody combat expected of them. On the left side of the panel, Licentious deals a mortal blow to Purpureus with a smaller incitator wearing a red loincloth below them. The next fight is between the retiarius Entinus and the secutor Baccibus under a horizontal trident. The incitator Astacius raises a whip and is positioned between Baccibus and the next pair of gladiators. Astivus, the hoplomachus, lies on the ground while the retiarius Astacius stands above him about to inflict the killing strike. The third incitator, Iaculator, stands between Astacius and a fragmented arm that hovers about the dead gladiator Rodan. Rocchetti points out these gladiatorial pairs are examples of Roman "expressionism" in contrast to the late-Hellenic idea of "orderly beauty," such as those found on battle scenes.

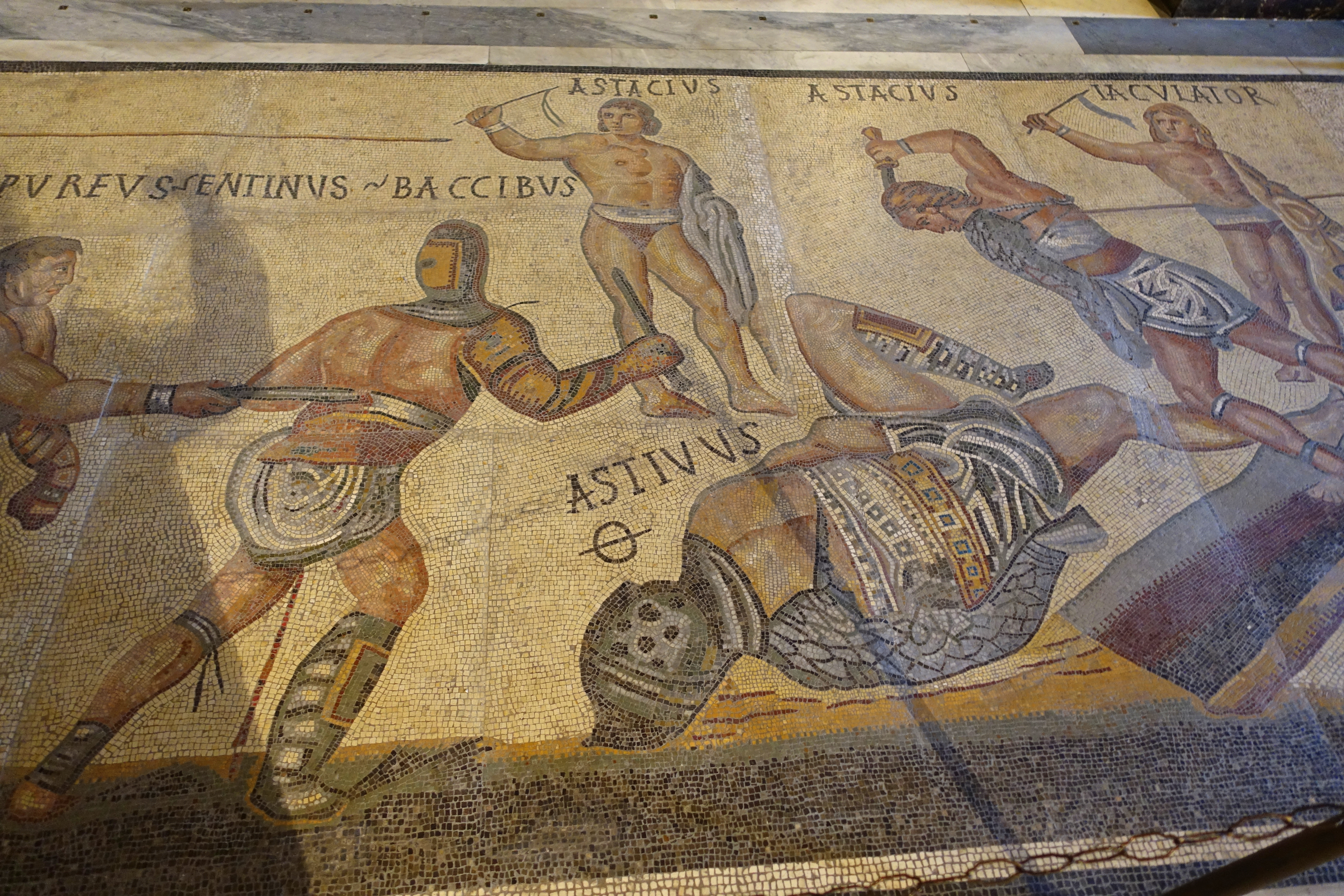
Detail of the match between Astivus and Astacius

A small panel found with the larger ones is also on display in the Salone di Mariano Rossi. It shows just a head wearing a galea in profile under the name Iaculator. This may have been a fragment from another panel that no longer survives. It could be related to the incitator found on panel 4.

Panel 6, currently not displayed on the Galleria Borghese website, shows three pairs of gladiators, an incitator and a single gladiator. It is the subject of a fundraising campaign for restoration by the Galleria Borghese. The first pair of combatants is Talamonius and Aurius, two retiarii where Talamonius is victorious and a Θ can be seen next to Aurius' head. Above the two retiarii is another pair of gladiators, the retiarius Cupido appears lying on the ground dead, while the secutor Bellefrons has dropped his shield and is delivering the death blow. Next gladiator, named Melea, has removed his helmet and is raising a long dagger while down on a knee next to a fallen secutor who is stretched out away from him, apparently in defeat from his match with Melea. Next is a smaller figure, Eliacer who is holding the reins of a partially preserved horse. Finally Pampineus stands heavily armed in the style of the hoplomachus.

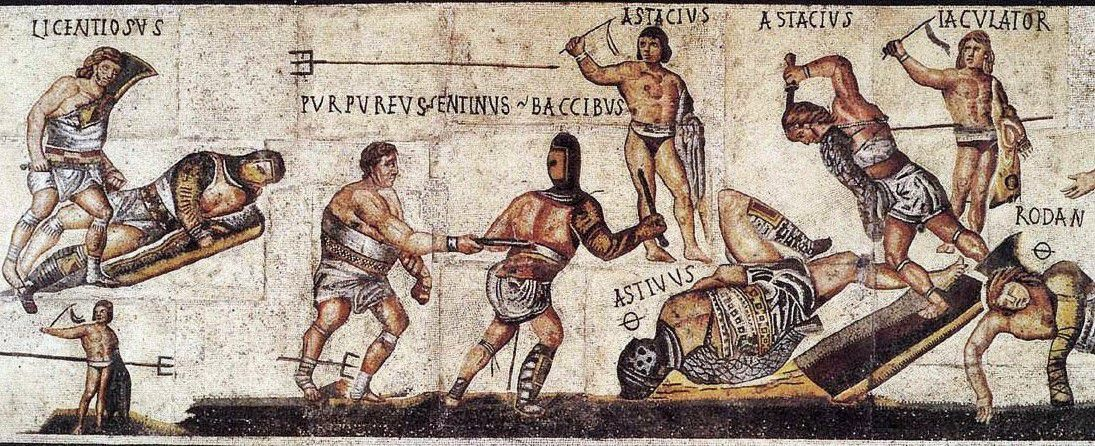
Panel 4 of the Gladiator Mosaic

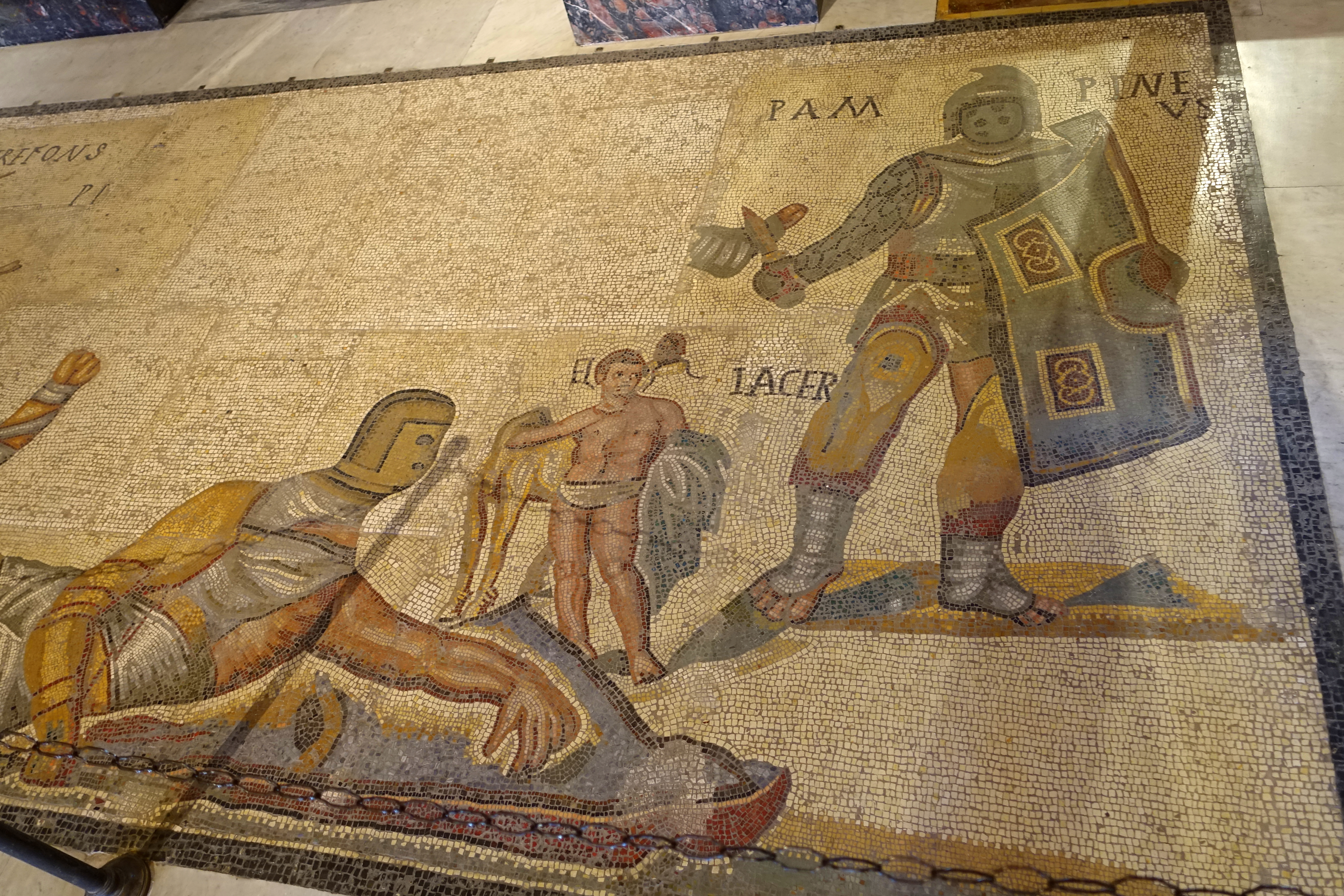
Panel 6 of the Gladiator Mosaic

Stylistically the mosaic shares decorative elements and themes similar to other 3rd and 4th-century works of art. A variety of scenes of hunting and fighting joined together in a single continuous narrative is similar to the mosaic floor found in a domus on the Aventine Hill. The tunics of the venatores are similar to those worn by hunters in the Villa Romana del Casale boar hunt mosaic in Piazza Armerina. While the geometric design on the shoulder of Melitio's tunic is similar to that found on the men hunting a rhinoceros in the Piazza Armerina mosaics.

== Inscription ==
The inscription is listed as CIL VI 10206. The // separates two different texts on the same mosaic while the [ ] indicates a missing inscription.

Panel 1: Sabatius

Panel 2: Melitio

Panel 3: [---]us vic(it)// Mazicinus/ Alumnus vic(it)// Ideus r(e)t(iarius)// Callimorfus/ Mazicinus// [---]us vic(it)/ Callimorfus// Serpeneus

Panel 4: Licentiosus/ [------]// Purpureus/ Entinus/ Baccibus// Astacius// Astacius/ Astivus ∅// Iaculator// [------]/ Rodan[---] ∅

Panel 5: Iaculator

Panel 6: (Note: This panel is not displayed on the Galleria Borghese website.) Talamonius/ Aureus ∅// Cupido ∅ / Bellerefons// [------]/ Pampineus// PI[---]// Arius// Eliacer// Melea[ger(?)]/ [------]
