= Centurion =

Army officer in Imperial Rome

A centurion (/sɛnˈtjʊəriən/; Latin: centurio [kɛn̪ˈt̪ʊrioː], pl. centuriones; Ancient Greek: κεντυρίων, romanized: kentyríōn, or Ancient Greek: ἑκατόνταρχος, romanized: hekatóntarkhos) was a type of officer in the Roman army who commanded a group of soldiers called a centuria or "century".

The term centurion is derived from the Latin word centurio, which itself originates from centum, meaning "hundred." Initially, centurions were commanders of a unit of roughly 100 soldiers, although the exact number varied over time and by period. The concept of the centurion emerged during the early Roman Republic (509–27 BCE), when Rome's military was based on citizen-soldiers organized into centuries (centuriae), units of 100 men within the Roman legion (legio).

Relative to modern military ranks, centurions are variously described as or equated to non-commissioned officers (NCOs), warrant officers, and as commissioned officers. Scholarly consensus holds that the position was a blend of NCO-status and commissioned officer-status, and close to various grades of captain (Note: Not to be confused with the naval rank of "captain") in terms of a direct analogy to modern rank. The Roman ranks of decanus and optio are generally regarded as being closer to classification as NCOs than centurions.

== Role ==
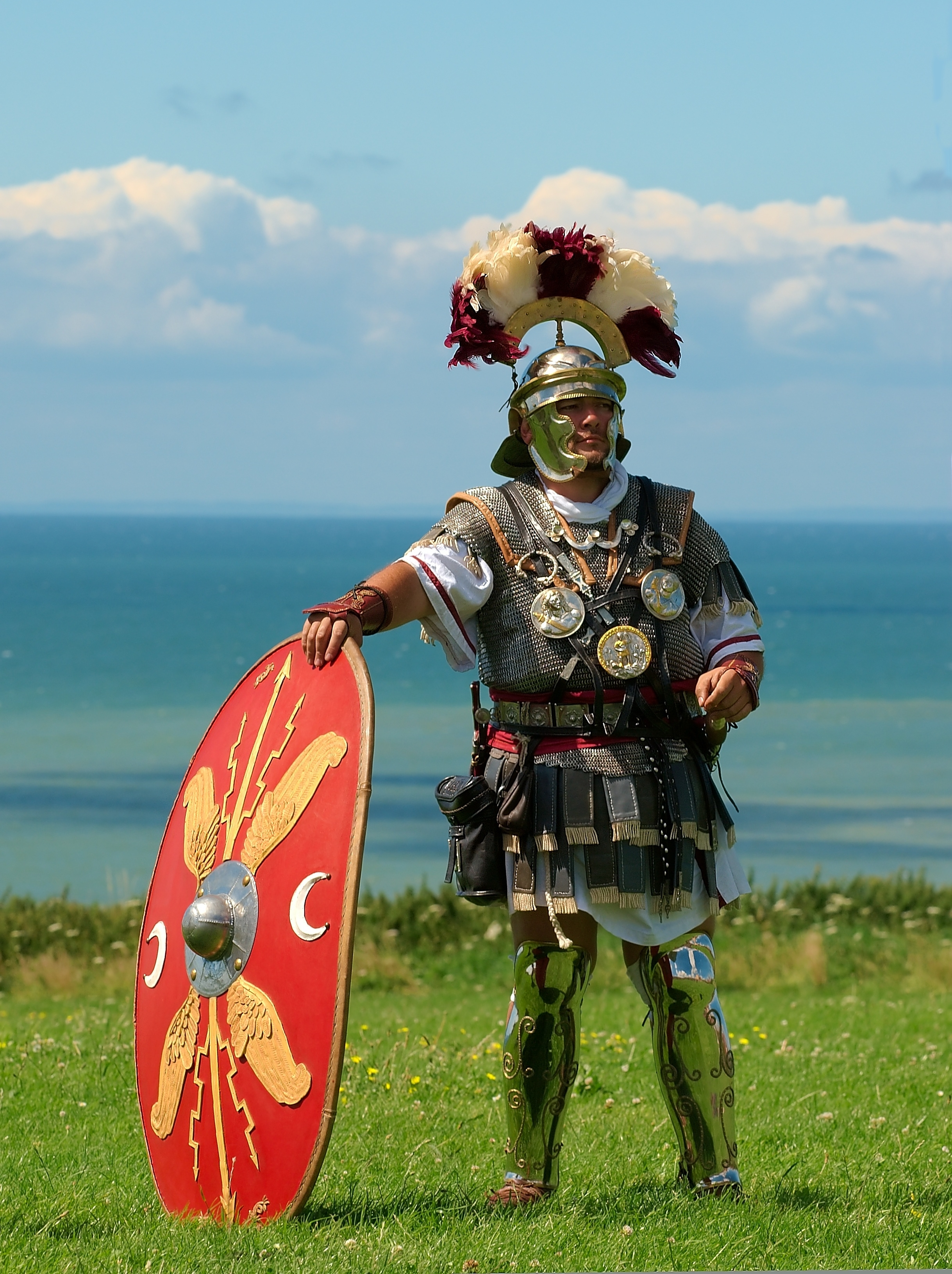
A historical reenactor in Roman centurion costume. Note that the vambraces used in this reconstruction are an anachronism.

In the Roman infantry, the centurions commanded a centuria. During the Mid-Republic these centuries were grouped in pairs to make up a maniple, each century consisting of 30–60 men. After the "Marian reforms", a century was typically composed of around 80 men, with six such centuries forming a cohort.

Roman centurions and junior officers were trained to operate independently. If a centurion saw a gap in the enemy line, he had the systemic authority to break formation and exploit it without waiting for the general's signal.

Centurions were drawn from five main sources within Roman society and the military. Some were promoted from the ranks of ordinary soldiers, often after holding minor posts under the centurionate. Others, though less commonly, gained their promotion after serving in auxiliary units. The remaining three sources were the most common. One group consisted of individuals from a class whose property qualifications were below that of the equestrian order. These men received their positions in the legions as a reward for merit. Many of them were magistrates from municipal towns who, through their service, secured full Roman citizenship, making them eligible for legionary service and subsequent appointment as centurions in recognition of their prior careers.

A notable fourth category of centurions came from the equestrian order. These individuals (ordinem accepit ex equite Romano) had previously held equestrian status but either lost their wealth, failed to advance in the equestrian career (cursus honorum), or chose to resign from the order. They voluntarily accepted a centurion's commission in the legions, often seeking a different path to distinction within the Roman military structure.

=== Seniority ===
Centurions during the republican manipular system were commanders of a centuria, with two centuriae comprising a maniple. The centurions of a maniple were all subject to a hierarchy that determined their rank. During the earlier Republican manipular system, the centurions of the triarii maniples occupied the most senior position, followed by those of the principes, who were then senior to the centurions of the maniples of the hastati. Within each of the three maniples seniority increased as individuals progressed from left to right, with each maniple increasing in seniority from front to back in battle position. A further distinction existed between prior and posterior centurions within the maniple, such that the posterior centurion of the maniple of the hastati, positioned at the far front left maniple, was the most junior centurion in the legion, while the prior centurion of the first maniple of the triarii, situated at the far right rear maniple, was the most senior and was known as the primipilus, since from the second century the triarii were often referred to as the pilani because of their column-like formation.

==== Hierarchy ====
Centurions were ranked hierarchically within the legion, with the ranks of centurions reflecting their seniority and responsibilities. After the Marian Reforms each legion contained 60 centurions leading their individual 60 centuriae, with 6 centuriae to a cohort and 10 cohorts to a legion, with each centurion commanding a centuria and inheriting the title of their position from the previous manipular system;

Primus Pilus:

- The highest-ranking centurion of the legion, commanding the first centuria of the first cohort. The primus pilus often served as an advisor to the Legatus (legion commander) and had significant influence over the legion's operations, being the fourth most senior of the legion under the Praefectus Castrorum and the Tribunus Laticlavius. The Primus Pilus, being the Pilus Prior of his cohort, did not have a Pilus Posterior, making the first cohort 5 double centuriae as opposed to the usual 6 of normal size.

Primi Ordines:

- The centurions of the first cohort preceded by the Primus Pilus. Led by the Primus Pilus, they were considered to be the most experienced centurions of the legion and along with the Primus Pilus commanded centuriae twice the size of the other centuriae within the lesser cohorts. They were also denoted by Prior and Posterior of their respective positions in the cohort.

Pilus Prior and Pilus Posterior:

- The centurions of the first and second centuriae in a standard cohort, ranked below the Primus Pilus and Primi Ordines, with the former being of higher command than the posterior within the legion hierarchy.

Princeps Prior and Princeps Posterior:

- Commanders of the third and fourth centuriae in a standard cohort.

Hastatus Prior and Hastatus Posterior:

- The centurions of the fifth and sixth centuriae in a standard cohort.

== Modern rank equivalency ==
Centurions are variously described as or equated to non-commissioned officers, warrant officers, and as commissioned officers. The Queen's University at Kingston argues that the rank was more similar to that of commissioned officers but that centurions "combined the function and prestige of a modern company commander and sergeant-major." Professor James S. Jeffers of California State University similarly argues that centurions performed duties which are analogous to a blend of modern senior non-commissioned officers and company grade officers. Professor Harry Pratt Judson asserted that the rank of centurion "nearly" corresponded to modern non-commissioned officer ranks but that their responsibilities were more akin to commissioned officers; Pratt would also clarify that centurions did not hold commissions, they were rather "appointed" by a legatus legionis (a legion's commanding general).

Historian Jason Abdale classifies centurions as variants of the modern rank of captain; equating lower-ranking centurions to "junior captains", mid-rank centurions to standard captains, and the most senior centurion in a legion (the primus pilus) to a senior captain or junior major.

Dr. Raffael D'Amatto asserts that centurions were similar to modern warrant officers and also describes them as "appoint[ed]" officers, not commissioned officers.

The Roman ranks of decanus and optio are generally regarded as being closer to classification as non-commissioned officers than centurions. Decanus is regarded as equating to corporal or sergeant while optio may be considered a senior sergeant or sergeant major, although modern renditions of Roman author Flavius Vegetius Renatus' 5th-century De re militari translates the optiones' description as junior commissioned officers (specifically, "subalterns").

== Qualities ==
A centurion was required to meet strict physical, tactical, and leadership standards, embodying the ideals of a Roman officer. They were chosen for their exceptional size, strength, and dexterity, particularly in throwing missile weapons and demonstrating expertise in the use of the sword and shield. Proficiency in all military exercises was essential to their role. Beyond physical capability, a centurion needed to possess key personal traits such as vigilance, temperance, and energy, ensuring they were always alert, self-controlled, and active in fulfilling their duties.

Obedience and discipline were paramount, as a centurion was expected to execute orders promptly and efficiently, prioritizing action over unnecessary discussion. They were also responsible for maintaining strict discipline among their soldiers, ensuring that their troops were clean, well-dressed, and presented a professional appearance at all times. Additionally, they oversaw the upkeep of weapons, requiring them to be polished, rubbed, and kept in excellent condition. In essence, the centurion was the embodiment of Roman military ideals, combining physical prowess, discipline, and leadership while enforcing these high standards among their men.

== Uniform and equipment ==
Centurions, as pivotal leaders in the Roman military, directly commanding men and participating alongside them in combat, were equipped similarly to their soldiers during the early periods of Roman history, but with distinct features that set them apart. In the early Republic, a soldier's equipment included a bronze or iron helmet (galea), chain-mail (lorica hamata — punched rings attached to each other with riveted or welded rings, forming a flexible metal "fabric" shaped into a vest or shirt, with additional material folded over the shoulders and secured across the chest with ties or metal clasps), scale armor (lorica squamata — metal scales wired together or sewn to a fabric backing, or lorica plumata — smaller scales attached to fine chain-mail, giving a "feathered" appearance), and the standard oblong shield (scutum). They carried the short stabbing sword (gladius), essential for close combat, a decorated dagger (pugio), and a spear (hasta) for thrusting attacks. One of the distinguishing features of a centurion's rank was the crest on their helmet, earlier mounted longitudinally, running front to back, resembling a boar's crest, though its orientation evolved in later periods, with centurions wearing transverse (side-to-side) crests, while the optio adopted the longitudinal crest. This made centurions more visible to their men during battle, giving them a visual mark to maintain formation, allowing their officers to more effectively lead and coordinate their troops. As individual soldiers purchased their own equipment out of an allowance, the particular form of a centurion's equipment could vary between units, across different territories, and over time, reflecting prevailing fashions and personal preferences.

=== Late Republic and Early Empire ===
During the Late Republic and the Early Empire, centurions began to wear more ornate and elaborate armor as a symbol of their elevated status. Their equipment was not only practical but also designed to command respect and authority on and off the battlefield. Key features of this period included:

Crested Helmet: Centurions wore helmets with a transverse crest made of horsehair or feathers, running left to right. This distinct design made them easily identifiable amidst the chaos of battle, serving both as a rallying point for soldiers and a mark of leadership.

- Segmented Armor: Centurions increasingly adopted lorica segmentata (an ahistorical term used by modern researchers, as the original name for this armor has been lost; Latin writers typically referred to any kind of body armor as lorica), a type of segmented plate armor that provided excellent flexibility and protection, possibly based on armor worn by a class of gladiator after a Gallic fashion known as crupellarius. While this armor became popular, chain-mail (lorica hamata) remained widely used, particularly among centurions in less affluent units or those stationed in less resourced provinces, however lorica hamata was more flexible than segmented armor, offered more protection to the upper thigh, more comfortable in hot climates, and could be repaired more easily, as it consists of only two types of uniformly sized rings, while segmented armor consists of multiple plates of different shapes requiring various forming operations to manufacture, connected by rivets to leather straps, and closed with tie loops, buckles, and clasps made of copper alloy.
- Muscled Armor: Armor consisting of a separate breastplate and backplate of metal, typically bronze, though some examples in iron are known to exist, with the breastplate shaped to resemble a heavily muscled human torso, as often seen in ancient artworks, typically associated with divine and heroic figures. Although often depicted in artwork as extending in a curved arch from the hips downward to protect the belly, in practice this would prevent bending at the waist; archaeological finds of actual armor meant for use in battle, as opposed to pieces made specifically as offerings for temple dedications, feature breastplates terminated at the waist, sometimes with a forward-projecting flare to accommodate riding on horseback. Some examples are highly detailed, with embossed, chased, and carved imagery representing mythological themes, members of the imperial family, historical events, classical designs such as acanthus leaves, or abstract figures.
- Vine staff: (vitis): The vitis was a short staff, traditionally made from a section of grapevine, carried by centurions as a symbol of their authority within the legion, similar to the "swagger stick," but also used to enforce discipline among the ranks, used by centurions at the rear of a file to urge on soldiers in front, and to beat any attempting to flee. The vitis was also used to flog soldiers as punishment.
- Ornamentation: Centurions’ armor and equipment were often adorned with intricate designs and embossed decorations, featuring motifs such as gods, animals, or other symbols of Roman power. These embellishments further highlighted their rank and distinguished them from ordinary soldiers. Many of these would have been awards for bravery and distinguished service, such as the laurel crown for leading troops to victory, and the mural crown, for being the first over an enemy's city wall. Multiple awards and medals could be displayed on a harness of leather straps worn over the armor; likely these were only worn for formal dress or parade occasions, and removed before battle.

By the High Empire, centurions’ uniforms and equipment became even more elaborate and ceremonial, reflecting the increasing professionalization and hierarchical structure of the Roman military. Their distinctive appearance emphasized their authority and their role as elite officers within the legions. Key features of this period included:

- Cingulum militare: A highly decorated military belt worn over the tunica, often featuring intricate metalwork and symbolic decorations. The cingulum was a practical item for carrying weapons but also served as a status symbol; soldiers in civilian garb would wear their cingulae over the everyday tunic as a mark of service.
- Cloak (Sagum): Centurions commonly wore a red cloak, known as the sagum, which symbolized their rank and authority. The red color was associated with power and leadership and made them stand out visually among the ranks.
- Greaves: Centurions often wore metal leg guards, or greaves, to protect their shins during combat. These were typically worn on one or both legs and reinforced their distinctive and prestigious appearance. Compared to greaves of the Classical Greek hoplite, made of a single piece of bronze shaped to the individual, secured by its own spring tension, Roman greaves typically only covered the front of the shin, with a separate protection for the knee (patella) connected with a hinge, and was secured to the leg with straps or ties.

=== Late Empire (3rd–5th century CE) ===
As the Roman army adapted to new threats and incorporated diverse influences, centurions’ uniforms became less standardized. The use of chain-mail and scale armor increased, as these could be more easily mass-produced and later adjusted to fit the wearer, while the iconic lorica segmentata, individually fitted to a particular wearer, fell out of favor. Helmets became more conical, influenced by Eastern and Germanic designs, abandoning hammered or spun bowl designs, in favor of helmets consisting of two pieces riveted together along the top from front to back, forming a reinforced ridge, sometimes extending into a nasal. These helmets, called Spangenhelm, often associated with Germanic and Scandinavian warriors, reflected their recruitment to serve in Late Roman and Byzantine imperial armies.

== Role in New Testament ==
Scholars have analyzed the literary and theological function of centurions in the Gospel of Luke and the Acts of the Apostles, in what is collectively known as Luke-Acts. In his 2014 study The Roman Army and the Expansion of the Gospel, Alexander Kyrychenko argues that the centurion serves as a "prototypical Gentile believer" within the two-volume narrative.

According to Kyrychenko, Luke portrays the centurion not merely as a soldier, but as a principal representative of Roman imperial power. By depicting these figures positively, the narrative anticipates the successful expansion of the Christian mission into the Roman Empire. This portrayal contrasts with some Jewish literature of the period, such as the later prophetic writings which viewed Rome as an enemy of God, though it shares similarities with Josephus, who also generally depicted the Roman military in a positive light to emphasize its power and structural order.

Christopher Chen extends this analysis by connecting the centurions' role directly to the identity of the work's recipient, Theophilus. Chen posits that Theophilus was a high-ranking Roman official and that Luke utilizes the centurions as "proponents of the gospel" specifically tailored to this audience. In this view, the recurring positive depiction of centurions serves to demonstrate to a Roman official that the Christian message had successfully made inroads at the "grassroots level of the Roman establishment". This reinforces an apologetic argument for the reasonableness of Christianity to political leaders, showing that faith in Jesus was compatible with service to the Empire.

Key appearances of centurions in the narrative include:

- The Centurion at Capernaum (Luke 7): Portrayed as a figure of unique faith who respects Jewish customs.
- The Centurion at the Cross (Luke 23): Acknowledges Jesus as dikaios (righteous/innocent).
- Cornelius (Acts 10–11): His conversion is treated as a seminal event in the admission of Gentiles to the church.
- Julius (Acts 27): Treats Paul kindly and ensures his safe delivery to Rome.

== See also ==
- List of Roman army unit types
- Military establishment of the Roman Empire
- Evocatus, related Roman rank
- Chiliarch, commander of a thousand

== Bibliography ==
- Chen, Christopher Sun-Young (2022). Theophilus and the Centurions: Roman Officials as the "Most Excellent" Proponents of the Gospel in Luke-Acts (Th.M. thesis). Louisville, KY: The Southern Baptist Theological Seminary.
- Goldsworthy, Adrian (2007). The Complete Roman Army. London: Thames & Hudson. ISBN 978-0-500-05124-5.
- D’Amato, Raffaele (2012). Roman Centurions, 31 BC – AD 500: The Classical and Late Empire. Oxford: Osprey. ISBN 978-1-84908-796-4.
- Kyrychenko, Alexander (2014). The Roman Army and the Expansion of the Gospel: The Role of the Centurion in Luke-Acts. Beihefte zur Zeitschrift für die neutestamentliche Wissenschaft. Vol. 203. Berlin: De Gruyter. ISBN 978-3-11-034726-5.
- Parker, Henry Michael (1928). The Roman legions. Oxford: Clarendon press. OCLC 1151159640.
- Phillips, Thomas R., ed. (1985). Roots of Strategy : The 5 Greatest Military Classics of all Time. Harrisburg: Stackpole Books. ISBN 0811721949.
- Sage, Michael (2010). The Republican Roman Army : A Sourcebook. New York: Routledge. ISBN 978-0415178808.
- Webster, Graham (1985). The Roman Imperial Army of the first and second centuries A.D. Totowa: Barnes & Noble. ISBN 0389205907.
