= Colchester Vase =

Roman British vase

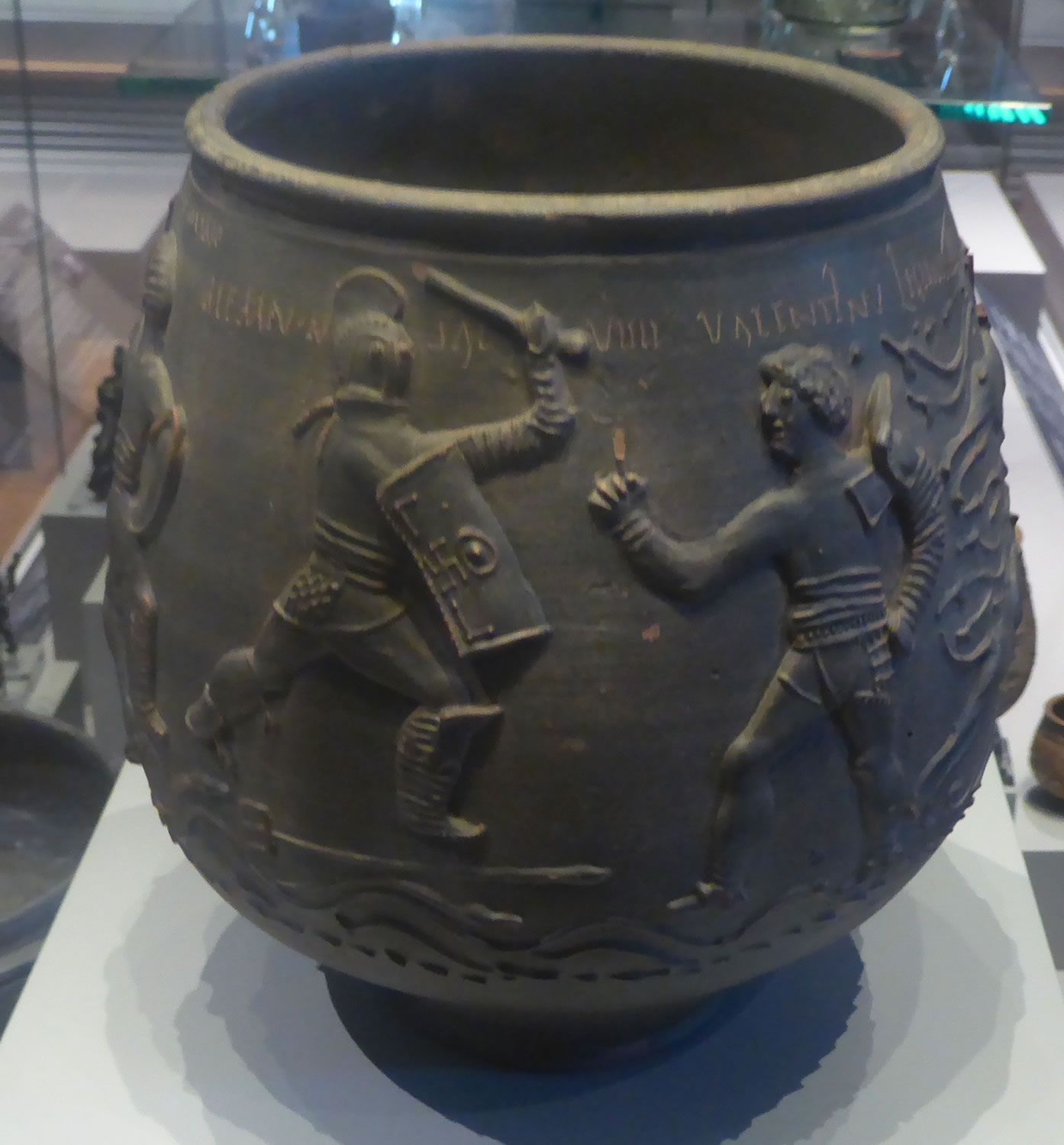
- Created: Romano-British, 175 AD
- Discovered: Colchester, Essex, England
- Place: West Lodge Roman Cemetery

The Colchester Vase is an ancient Roman British vase made from local clay from Colchester, England, dating to 175 AD, depicting a gladiator battle between two individuals: Memnon and Valentinus, which are believed to be stage names.

It was discovered in a Roman-era grave in 1853, which held the deceased's cremated remains.

It is currently held in the Colchester Castle Museum collection, and is renowned as one of the finest pieces of Roman-British pottery in existence.

== Description ==
The vase is 17.5 cm in diameter and 22.5 cm high, weighs 1 kilogram and is made of coarse local clay. It is a variant of Ancient Roman pottery, called black ware, which was used primarily for storage or cooking. The vase derives either from Durobrivian or Castor Ware. It was discovered in 1853 in West Lodge Road by local antiquarian John Taylor, who donated it to the Colchester Castle Museum. The vase contained the cremated remains of a 40+ year old, non-local resident.

Initially presumed to be an imported object, thanks to the sophistication of the figures on the vase, a 2023 analysis of the vase indicates a local origin. The vase demonstrates the extent of gladiatorial combat on the outskirts of the Roman Empire. The text on the vase was etched in while the clay was soft before the vase was baked in a kiln.

Roman Colchester (Colonia Claudia Victricensis), or Camulodunum, is famous as a center of pottery production during the 3rd century, with 40 documented kilns in the town.

== Imagery ==
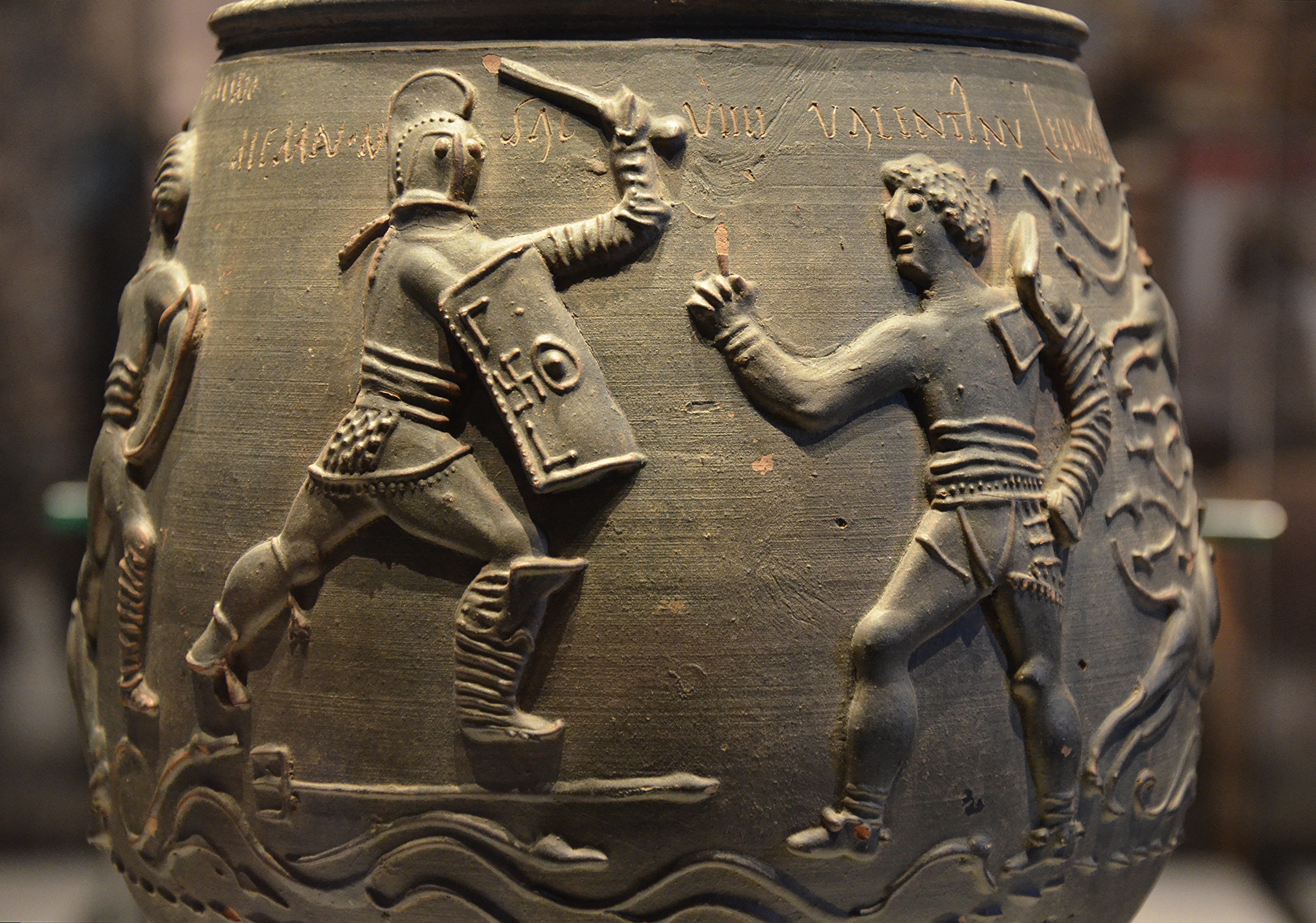
The names of the four gladiators—Secundus against Marius, Memnon, and Valentinus—are inscribed around the top of the vase

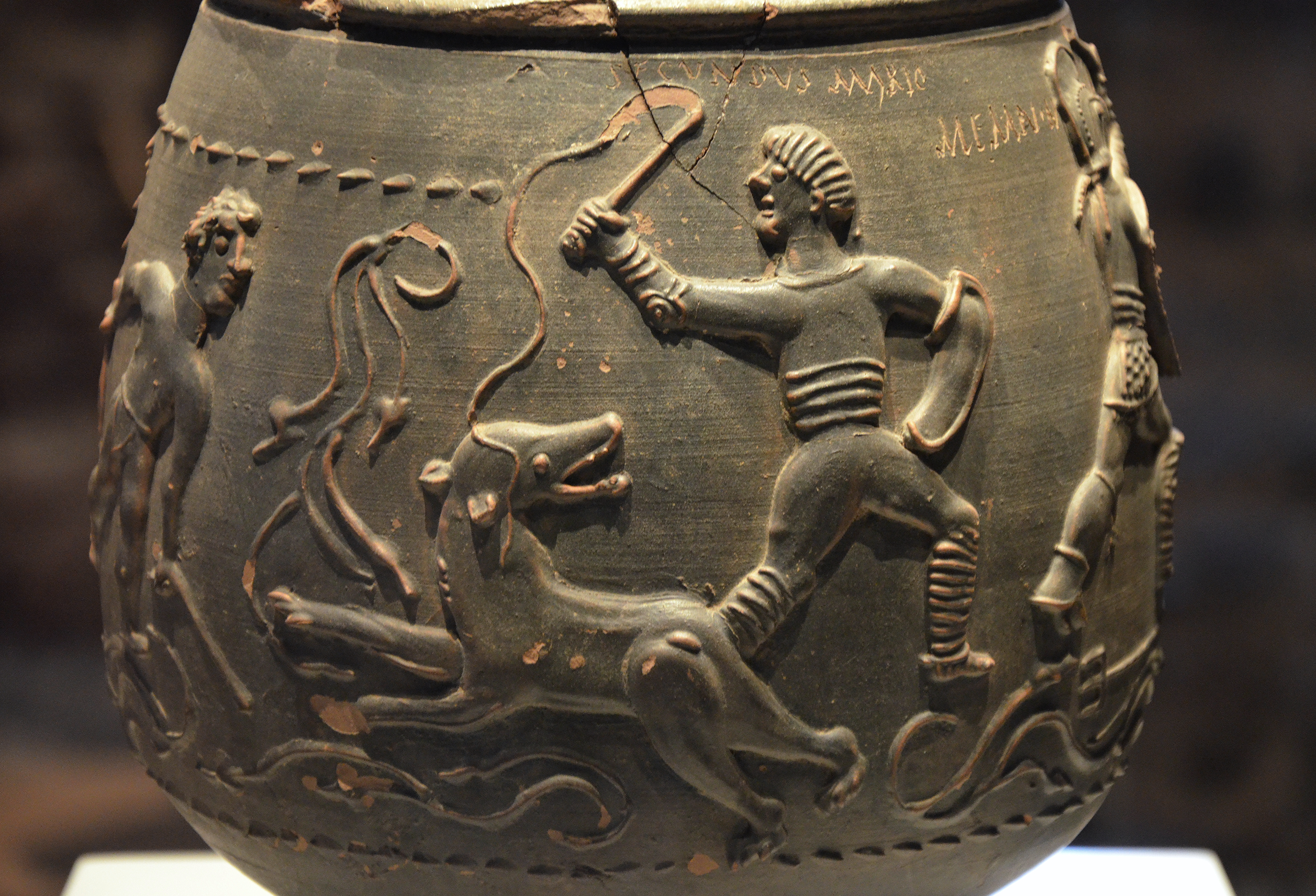
The venator

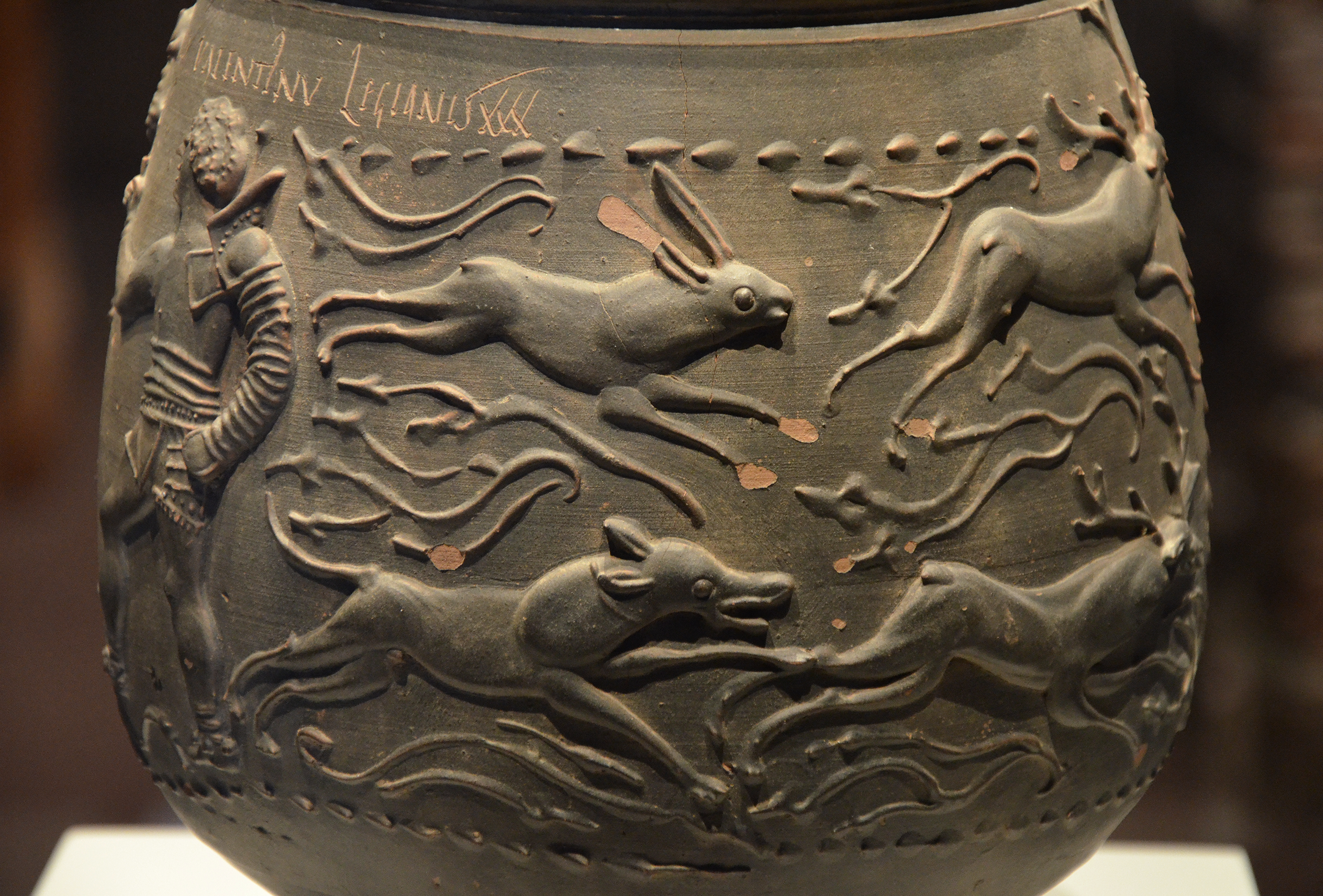
The chase

Camulodunum was a major hub of Roman Britain, boasting public recreational structures including two Roman theatres in which the gladiator battle could have taken place. A similar jar, now housed in the British Museum, attests to such recreational activities in the city.

The jar is decorated with three different scenes, relating to the different recreational activities common at the time. The inscription on the vase reads:

'Secundus (and) Mario'/'Memnon the secutor (victor) nine (times)'/'Valentinu(s) of the Thirtieth Legion'

The first scene depicts animal-animal fighting, with a dog chasing two deer and a hare.

The second scene depicts the bestiarius, the animal hunting spectacle, with venators named Secundus and Mario fighting a bear. Mario is a dative of "Marius"; the location of the names do not specifically tag or identify the beast-fighting figures.

The second scene depicts the gladiator battle of two men: Memnon, a secutor and Valentinus, a retiarius. The text identifies Valentinus as a member of the Legio XXX Ulpia Victrix, though it is noted that the Legio XXX was not based in Britain, but rather in Germania Inferior, in present-day Xanten. Memnon is labelled as the victor of the match, with "VIIII" indicating this is his ninth victory, with Valentinus depicted as raising his finger in defeat. Memnon, a reference to the mythical Ethiopian king in the Trojan War, is believed to be a stage name for the winning fighter, and also extant evidence of Roman residents of African descent in the area.

== Identity and Demographic ==
In 2020-2021, the Colchester Museums and the University of Reading, conducted a demographic survey of the known Roman-era cremains in an initiative called Decoding the Dead. This survey consisted of an examination of 22 identified urns, with extraction of a sample from the petrous bone, determined to be a suitable alternative when teeth samples cannot be extracted.

Based upon environmental exposure, the concentration of isotopes Lead-207 and Lead-206 served as a general inference to lifetime lead exposure amongst the individuals sampled. The gladiator interned in the vase (sampled as Individual #18), had levels of lead consistent with individuals from present day Spain, indicating that he was an immigrant from the Mediterranean. Strontium-86 and 87, levels also studied within the individual also indicate he lived in Colchester, or Roman Britain for some time.
