= Arbelas =

Type of Roman gladiator

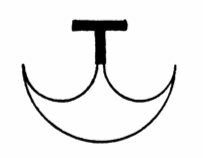
Arbelos

The arbelas (plural arbelai) was a type of ancient Roman gladiator. The word is a hapax legomenon, occurring only in the Oneirocritica of Artemidorus, a Greek work on dream interpretation that discusses the symbolism of various gladiator types. It may be related to the Greek word arbelos (ἄρβηλος), a cobbler's semicircular blade used to cut leather similar to an ulu.

A few reliefs show gladiators armed with a curved blade fighting each other; it has been argued that these (possibly also fighting retiarii, the net-fighters) are arbelai; however, they have also been seen as the scissores who likewise may have been matched against retiarii.

Artemidorus lists the arbelas among gladiators who might appear in dreams advising a man about what sort of woman he is to marry. Both the dimachaerus, who fought with two curved blades, and the "so-called" arbelas signify that the woman will either be a poisoner, malicious, or ugly.

== See also ==
- List of Roman gladiator types
