= Laquearius =

Type of Roman gladiator

The laquearius, laquerarius, or laqueator (plural laquearii, laquerarii, and laqueatores; literally, "snarer") was a class of Roman gladiator that fought with a lasso or noose (laqueus) in one hand and a poniard or sword in the other. The laquearius appeared late in the history of the Roman games. They may have made up a full-fledged gladiator class that fought actual bouts in the arena. If this was the case, the snarer likely followed the same tactics as the retiarius, a gladiator who wielded a throwing net and trident. Such combat-oriented laquearii fought by attempting to snare their adversaries with the lasso to allow for a follow-up strike from the blade. The snarer's armour was probably similar to that of the retiarius; it consisted mainly of a retiarius armguard worn over the left shoulder. Another possibility is that the laquearius was a kind of paegniarius, or clown. These men fought mock battles in the arena as comic relief between real matches.

Most gladiator types were based on real-world antecedents. Because the Romans did not use lassos on the battlefield, it is unlikely that the laquearius was based on a Roman model. Instead, it may have been based on a barbarian tribe known to the Romans to use lassos in combat, such as the Sagartians. Another possibility is that the noose gladiator was meant to represent an executioner. However, the fact that his backup weapon was sword makes this seem unlikely.

== See also ==
- List of Roman gladiator types
