= Venatio =

Type of entertainment in ancient Rome involving the hunting and killing of wild animals

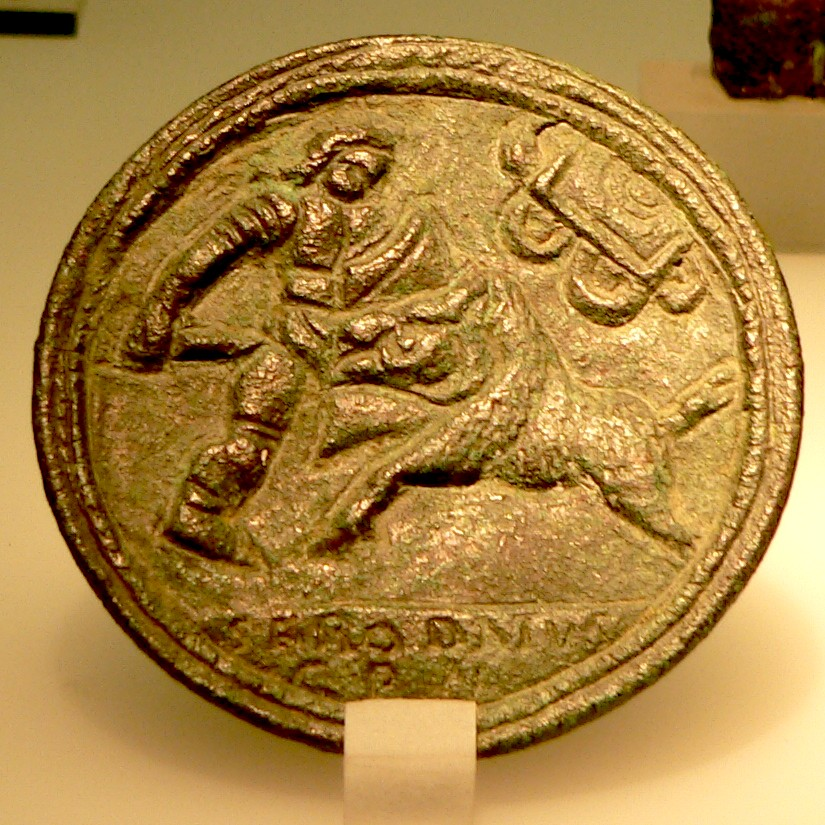
Bronze medallion depicting the fight between a man and a wild animal (venatio).

Venatio (Latin: venatio, "hunting", plural venationes) was a type of entertainment in Roman amphitheaters involving the hunting and killing of wild animals.

== History ==
Venatio was first introduced by Marcus Fulvius Nobilior, who celebrated his Greek campaign by hosting games where gladiators would fight lions and panthers.

Exotic wild beasts from the far reaches of the Roman Empire were brought to Rome and hunts were held in the morning prior to the afternoon main event of gladiatorial duels. The hunts were held in the Roman Forum, the Saepta, and in the Circus Maximus, though none of these venues offered protection to the crowd from the wild animals on display. Special precautions were taken to prevent the animals from escaping these venues, such as the erection of barriers and the digging of ditches. Very few animals survived these hunts though they did sometimes defeat the "bestiarius", or hunter of wild beast. Thousands of wild animals would be slaughtered in one day. During the Inaugural games of the Flavian Amphitheatre (80), about 9,000 animals were killed.

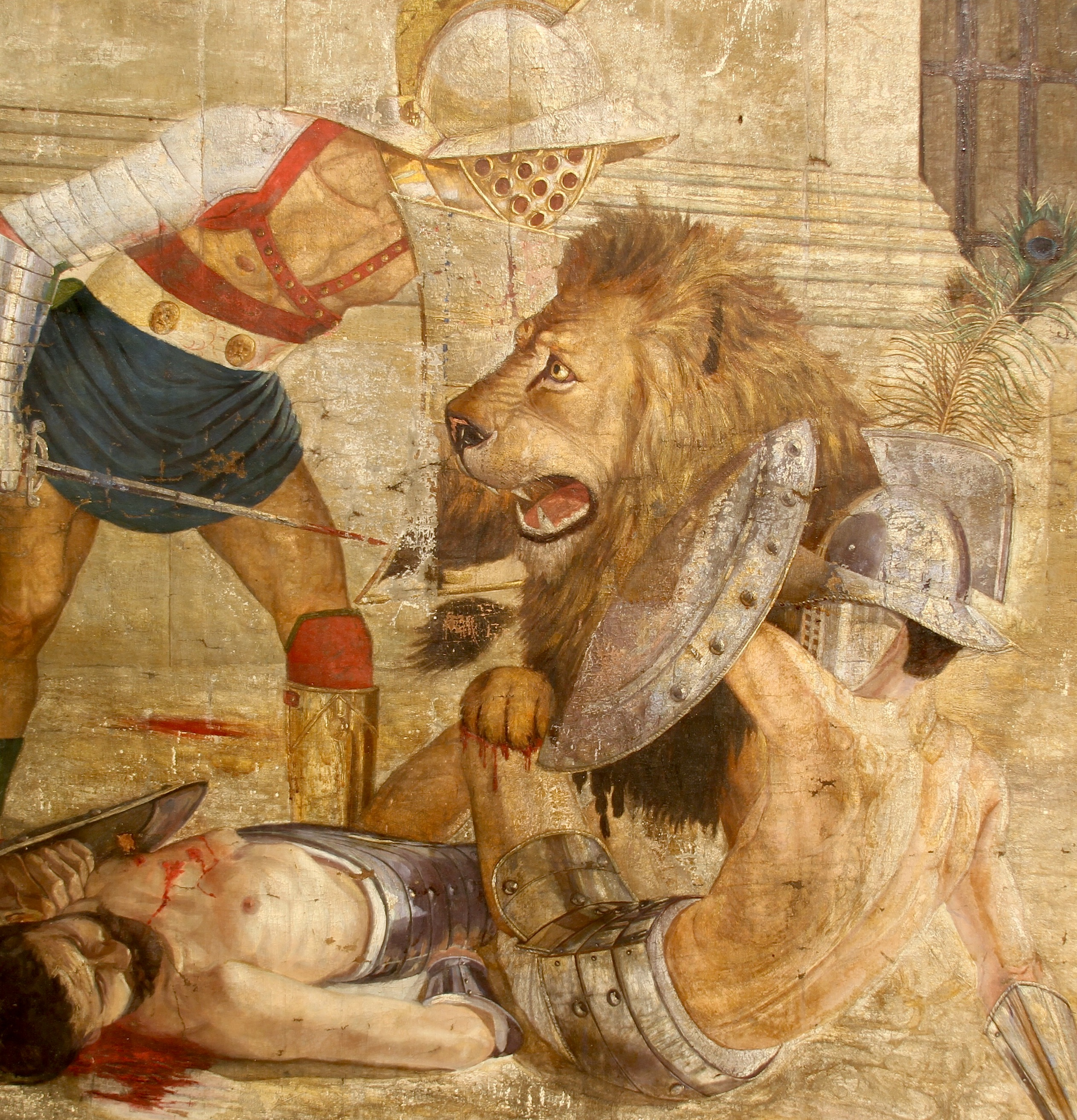
Venatio, Gladiator and Lion in the Colosseum

Not all the animals were ferocious, though most were. Animals that appeared in the venatio included lions, elephants, bears, tigers, deer, cows, wolverines, zebras, ostriches, vultures, weasels, polecats, minks, giraffes, eagles, wild goats, parrots, dogs, camels, monkeys, jackals, foxes, leopards, crocodiles, boars, hippos, cheetahs and rabbits. Some of these animals were trained, and instead of fighting, performed tricks.

The treatment given to wolves differed from the treatment meted out to other large predators. The Romans generally seem to have refrained from intentionally harming wolves. For instance, they were not displayed in the venationes due to their religious importance to the Romans.

Revered for its ferocity, the lion was extremely popular in venationes and gladiatorial shows. Thus the dictator Caesar used 400 lions (imported primarily from North Africa and Syria) in the Circus, where the inclusion of the foreign animal lent his shows extra panache. Indeed, obtaining the animals from the far-flung corners of the empire was an ostentatious display of wealth and power by the emperor or other patron to the populace, and was also meant to demonstrate Roman power of the whole human and animal world and to show the plebs of Rome exotic animals they might never see otherwise.

During the reign of Augustus Caesar, the circus games resulted in the death of 3,500 elephants.

== Executions ==
Following the venatio in the order of daily events was the execution of convicted Roman citizens of lower status, the humiliores. Usual forms of execution included burning at the stake, crucifixion, or ad bestias (when the prisoner is left alone in the ring with one or more wild animals).

Roman emperors often sentenced serious criminals — who then became known as bestiarii — to fatal encounters with the beasts in the Colosseum — an ancient "death sentence". These were the lowest social class of participants in the games.

== See also ==
- Atlas bear
- Barbary lion
- Blood sport
- Spectacles in ancient Rome
- Colchester Vase
