= Essedarius =

Type of Ancient Roman gladiator

An essedarius was a type of gladiator in Ancient Rome who fought from a chariot. The word was used in Caesar's Gallic Wars to describe British charioteers, who were driven over the battlefield, throwing spears at the enemy, then dismounted to fight or launched themselves along the chariot yoke. There are few references to them in the literature. In Petronius' Satyricon, one fights to the accompaniment of a water-organ. Seneca remarks on the difficulty of recognising a dismounted essedarius; this has been taken to imply that their fighting from chariots was their most distinctive feature. Some, most, or all essedarii had drivers, and some chariot fighters may have been citizens; Suetonius describes Caligula's annoyance at tripping and falling, distracted by the applause of the crowd when a successful essedarius freed the slave who had driven him.

If the reported armaments and skills of the British charioteers in the Gallic Wars are a guide to the gladiator type, then essedarii normally fought with a spear and sword, with a small shield for defense. They might also have worn a manica for arm protection. Like any other gladiator, a successful essedarius could buy their freedom - or have it bought for them. Beryllus of Nemausis, in Gaul, was freed after his twentieth match, in the early 1st century AD, with money from his wife (CIL 12.3323). She was probably a freedwoman.

== See also ==
- List of Roman gladiator types
