= Scissor (gladiator) =

Type of Roman gladiator

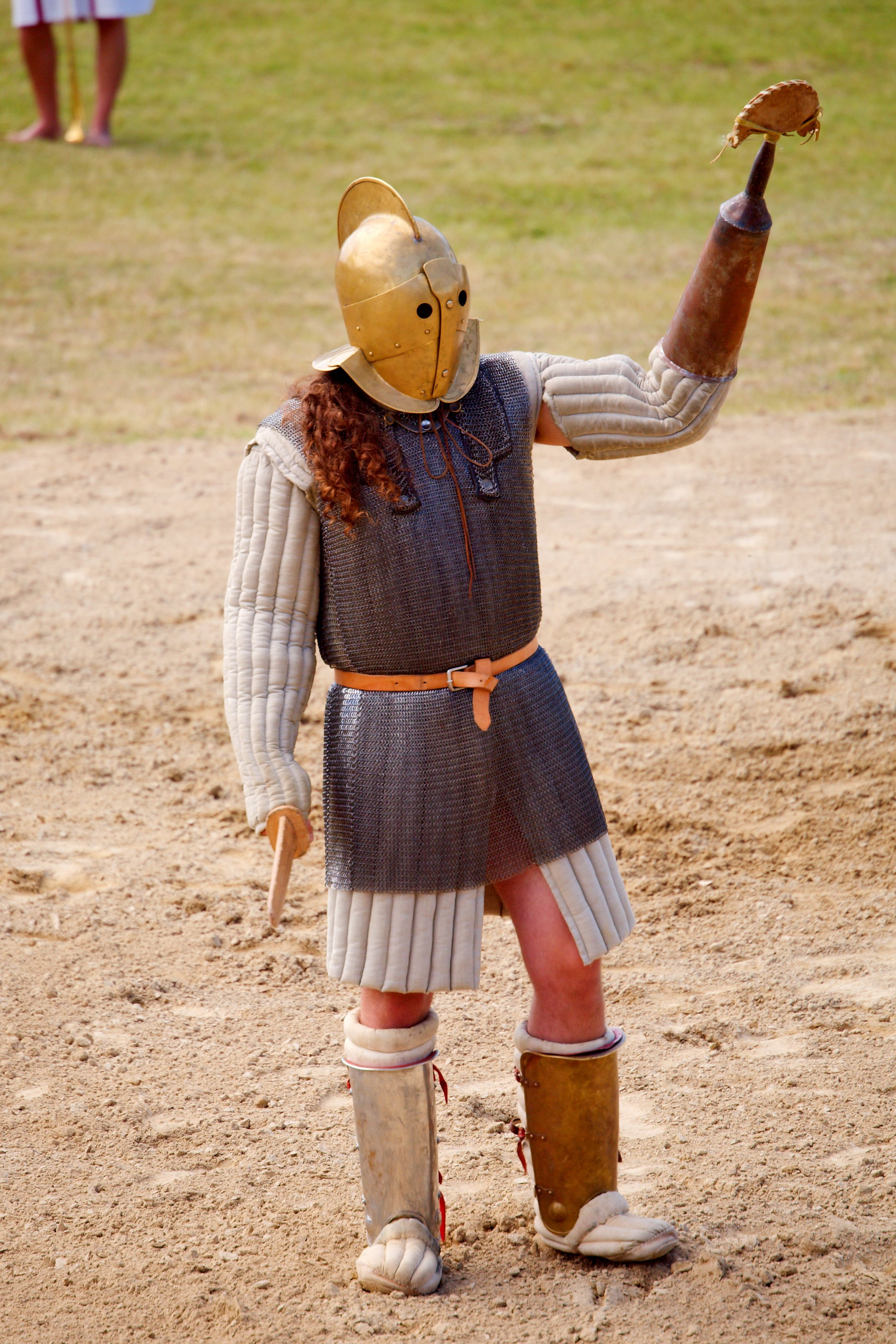
Scissor gladiator actor.

The scissor (pl. scissores) was a type of Roman gladiator. Very little is known about them and they were not mentioned after the first century BCE. The name, from the verb scindere ("to cut") means cleaver, carver, or slasher. Historian Marcus Junkelmann identified what he termed a scissor in a relief in the late 1980s. The figure, however, has also been identified as an arbelas by other historians. It is possible that the scissores went extinct or were later reclassed as arbelai. The scissores may have evolved from the secutor due to the similarity in armor, helmet, and gladius, as well as being "anti-retiarius."

Scissores wore a full-face helmet similar to that of the hoplomachi or the secutores, and wore heavy armor. They held a gladius in one hand and a "single-edged curved blade," similar to a mezzaluna or an arbelas blade, on his forearm. This semicircular blade was attached to a steel tube that spanned the arm. It served as a shield in addition to a weapon and a handle inside provided increased mobility.

== See also ==
- List of Roman gladiator types
