= Venefica (sorceress) =

Roman sorceress

A Venefica was a Roman sorceress who used drugs, potions, and poison for several reasons. Venefica means "a female who poisons" in Latin. Veneficus was the masculine form.

The word appears in Roman authors such as Cicero and Horace. In Ovid's Heroides, the character of Hypsipyle refers to Medea as a venefica for utilizing magic potions concocted from herbs, instead of her beauty and character, to ensorcell Jason.

Later it appears in one of Sir Francis Bacon's Essays,"Of Friendship" in the following lines:

"And it seemeth his favour was so great, as Antonius, in a letter which is recited verbatim in one of Cicero’s Philippics, calleth him ‘venefica,’ witch, —as if he had enchanted Caesar."
