= Crupellarius =

Gladiator type

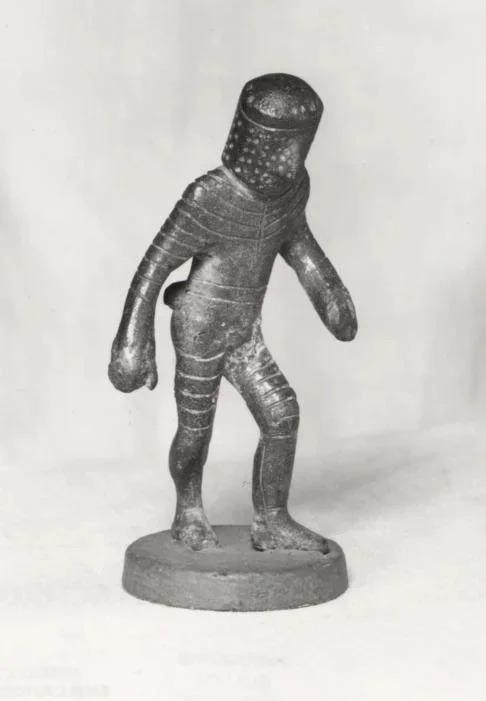
A 1st-century CE bronze figurine from Versigny, France, which may be a crupellarius.

A Crupellarius (Latin: Crupellarius, pl. Crupellarii) was a type of heavy armored gladiator during the Roman Imperial age, whose origin was Gaul.

== Etymology ==
The etymology of the term crupellarius remains uncertain, as the word is a hapax legomenon in classical literature, appearing only once in the accusative plural form crupellarios within Tacitus's Annals. Because the gladiator type originated in Gaul, scholars hypothesize a Gallic or Proto-Celtic origin that was subsequently Latinized.

One linguistic hypothesis connects the prefix to the Proto-Celtic root *kru- (seen in reconstructed terms like *krundis, meaning "round", or *kruttos, meaning "round object"), potentially referencing the characteristic cylindrical or rounded shape of the gladiator's helmet. Under this framework, the medial element -pell- may derive from the Latin pellis ("skin" or "hide"), though this hybrid compounding is unverified. Alternatively, a purely Latin origin has been suggested linking the prefix to cruor ("blood" or "gore"), though a definitive philological consensus does not exist. The standard Latin suffix -arius is appended as an agent noun to denote an occupation or practitioner.

== Equipment and style ==
Historical data regarding the equipment of the crupellarius derives primarily from Tacitus's account of the Revolt of Florus and Sacrovir in AD 21. Tacitus describes these fighters as gladiatorial slaves clad in a "continuous shell of iron" according to their national custom. This defensive array rendered the crupellarius virtually impervious to standard Roman thrusting and piercing weapons, such as the gladius and pilum, but severely restricted offensive capabilities, making them "too weighty to inflict wounds."

On the battlefield, their style relied entirely on defensive encumbrance and passive endurance. They lacked the agility for active combat, acting instead as a static physical vanguard. Roman legionaries defeated them not by penetrating the armor with standard swords, but by utilizing heavy entrenching equipment—specifically axes and picks—to hack through the iron plating "as if demolishing a wall." Additionally, they were easily neutralized with long poles or forks; due to the extreme distribution of weight, an overturned crupellarius remained completely immobilized on the ground without the ability to rise.

== Archaeology ==
While classical literature leaves the visual specificities of the fighter vague, physical evidence can possibly be represented by an 11-centimeter bronze votive figurine discovered during excavations in 1974 at Versigny, France. Currently housed in the Musée Jeanne d'Aboville, the artifact dates to the 1st century CE and possibly provides a visual template for the "continuous shell of iron" noted by Tacitus.

The figurine depicts a warrior entirely encased in segmented armor overlapping downstream, extending down the arms and legs in a style similar to the Roman manica. The helmet is distinctively cylindrical, featuring a flat top with tiny perforated eyeholes, minimizing structural weaknesses at the cost of the wearer's sight.

== See also ==
- List of Roman gladiator types
