= Bestiarius =

Ancient Roman term

Among Ancient Romans, bestiarii (singular bestiarius) were those who went into combat with beasts, or were exposed to them. It is conventional to distinguish two categories of bestiarii: the first were those condemned to death via the beasts (see damnatio ad bestias) and the second were those who faced them voluntarily, for pay or glory (see venatio). The latter are sometimes erroneously called "gladiators"; to their contemporaries, however, the Latin term gladiator referred specifically to one who fought other men. The contemporary term for those who made a career out of participating in arena "hunts" was venatores.

== As a form of execution ==
As a means of torturous capital punishment, death by wild beasts was a punishment for enemies of the state, a category which included those taken prisoner and slaves found guilty of a serious crime. These were sent to their deaths naked and unable to defend themselves against the beasts. Even if they succeeded in killing one, fresh animals were continually let loose until the bestiarii were all dead. It is reported that it was rarely necessary for two beasts to be required to take down one man. On the contrary, one beast frequently dispatched several men. Cicero mentions a single lion which alone dispatched 200 bestiarii.

Seneca relates that a German prisoner, rather than participate, killed himself by forcing a sponge used in the lavatory down his throat. "What a brave fellow!", said Seneca, "He surely deserved to be allowed to choose his fate! How bravely he would have wielded a sword!". Another nodded as if asleep and, lowering his head, thrust it between the spokes of the cart wheel, breaking his neck. Symmachus writes of 29 Saxon prisoners strangling one another in their cells the night before they were to appear in the arena.

== Voluntary combat ==
Bestiarii, as reported by Seneca, consisted of young men who, to become expert in managing their arms, fought sometimes against beasts, and sometimes against one another; and of bravos who, to show their courage and dexterity, exposed themselves to this dangerous combat. Augustus encouraged this practice in young men of the first rank. Nero exposed himself to it; and it was for killing beasts in the amphitheatre that Commodus acquired the title of the Roman Hercules.

Vigenère adds two more types of bestiarii: the first were those who made a trade of it, and fought for money. It appears that there were schools in Rome, in which people were trained to fight wild beasts (scholae bestiarum, or bestiariorum). The second type was where several armed bestiarii were let loose at once against a number of beasts.

== See also ==
- List of Roman gladiator types
