= Bellamy salute =

1892–1942 salute to the flag of the US

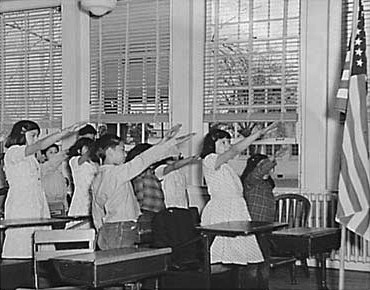
Children performing the Bellamy salute to the flag of the United States, 1941

The Bellamy salute is a straightened hand and palm-down salute to the flag of the United States. Created by James B. Upham as the gesture that was to accompany the Pledge of Allegiance of the United States, whose text had been written by Francis Bellamy, it was known as the flag salute during the period when it was used, from 1892 to 1942, with the Pledge of Allegiance. Bellamy promoted the salute and thus it was retroactively renamed after him.

Later, during the 1920s and 1930s, Italian Fascists and German Nazis in Europe adopted a similar salute that also resembled the Roman salute, a gesture attributed to ancient Rome. The introduction of the Nazi salute resulted in controversy over the use of the Bellamy salute in the United States, especially once the country entered the European theater of World War II after Germany and Italy declared war against the United States. The Bellamy salute was replaced with saluting the flag by placing the right hand over the heart when Congress amended the Flag Code on December 22, 1942. The hand over the heart is still used today.

== History ==
The inventor of the Bellamy salute was James B. Upham, junior partner and editor of The Youth's Companion. Bellamy recalled that Upham, upon reading the pledge, came into the posture of the salute, snapped his heels together, and said, "Now up there is the flag; I come to salute; as I say 'I pledge allegiance to my flag', I stretch out my right hand and keep it raised while I say the stirring words that follow." By the time the official program was published, the Bellamy salute would begin with a traditional military salute as the first words of the pledge were spoken.

The Bellamy salute was first demonstrated on October 21, 1892, according to Bellamy's published instructions for the "National School Celebration of Columbus Day" as the 400th Anniversary of the Discovery of America. A presidential proclamation called for this special, national holiday to take place on Friday, October 21, rather than October 12, accounting for nine of the eleven days skipped over in 1752 as the 13 colonies transitioned from the Julian to the Gregorian calendar. The goal was to mark the near exact day 400 years ago and also providing a work holiday, but also avoiding celebrating the occasion on a Saturday or Sunday, rather than the Gregorian date of October 23. With an already established tradition celebrating Columbus's having landed on October 12, New York City opted to schedule three special parades and several VIP celebrations with their events taking place from October 11–13.

From The Official Programme regarding the planned flag salute:

At a signal from the Principal the pupils, in ordered ranks, hands to the side, face the Flag. Another signal is given; every pupil gives the flag the military salute – right hand lifted, palm downward, to align with the forehead and close to it. Standing thus, all repeat together, slowly, "I pledge allegiance to my Flag and the Republic for which it stands; one Nation indivisible, with Liberty and Justice for all." At the words, "to my Flag", the right hand is extended gracefully, palm upward, toward the Flag, and remains in this gesture till the end of the affirmation; whereupon all hands immediately drop to the side.

— The Youth's Companion, 65 (1892): 446.

In the 1920s, Italian fascists adopted the Roman salute to symbolize their claim to have revitalized Italy on the model of ancient Rome. A similar ritual was adopted by the German Nazis, creating the Nazi salute. Controversy grew in the United States on the use of the Bellamy salute given its similarity to the fascist salutes. School boards around the country revised the salute to avoid this similarity. There was a counter-backlash from the United States Flag Association and the Daughters of the American Revolution, who felt it inappropriate for Americans to have to change the traditional salute because foreigners had later adopted a similar gesture.

From 1939 until the attack on Pearl Harbor, critics of Americans who argued against intervention in World War II produced propaganda using the salute to lessen those Americans' reputations. Among the anti-interventionist Americans was aviation pioneer Charles Lindbergh. The pictures of him appearing to do the Nazi salute are actually pictures of him using the Bellamy salute. In his Pulitzer Prize-winning biography Lindbergh (1998), author A. Scott Berg explains that interventionist propagandists would photograph Lindbergh and other isolationists using this salute from an angle that left out the American flag, so it would be indistinguishable to observers from the Nazi salute.

On June 22, 1942, at the urging of the American Legion and the Veterans of Foreign Wars, Congress passed Public Law 77-623, which codified the etiquette used to display and pledge allegiance to the flag. This included the use of a palm-out salute, specifically that the pledge "be rendered by standing with the right hand over the heart; extending the right hand, palm upward, toward the flag at the words 'to the flag' and holding this position until the end, when the hand drops to the side." Congress did not discuss or take into account the controversy over use of the salute. Congress later amended the code on December 22, 1942, when it passed Public Law 77-829, stating among other changes, that the pledge "be rendered by standing with the right hand over the heart."

== Gallery ==
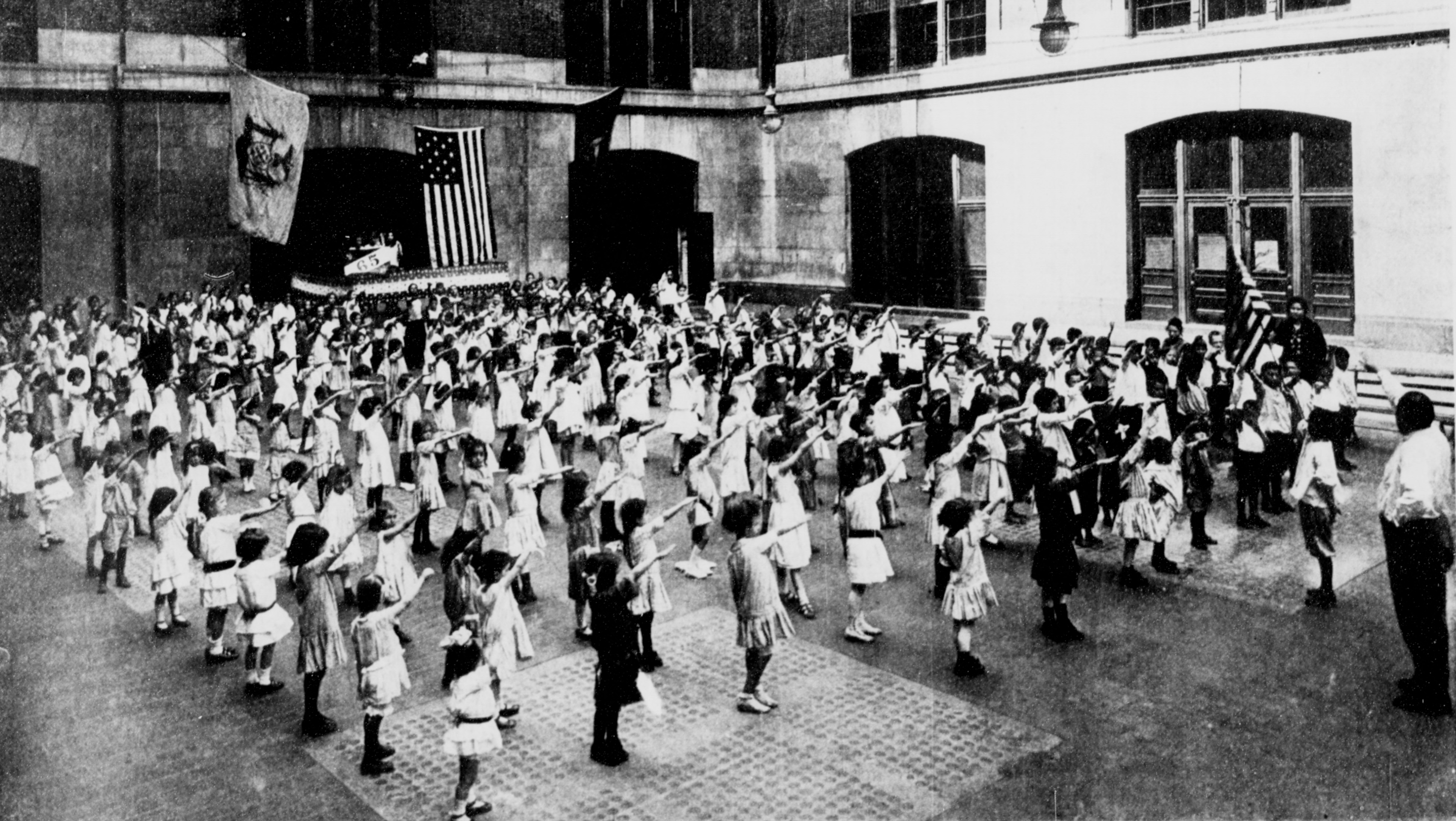
School children saluting the American flag, September 1915

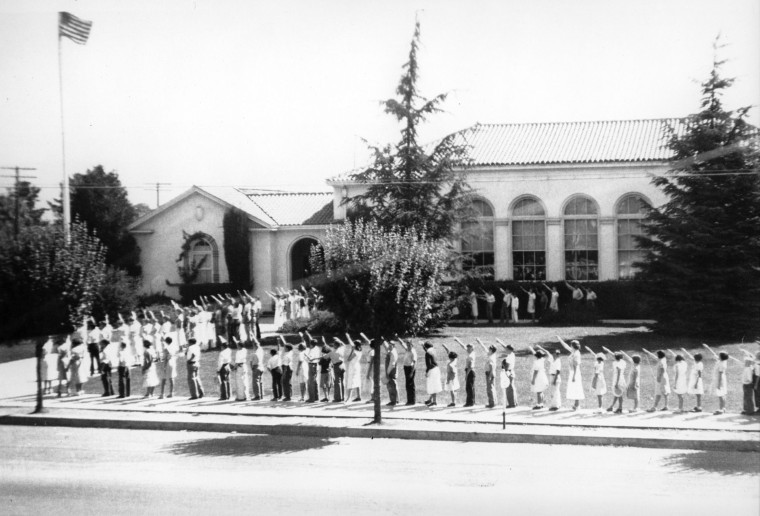
Children salute the American flag in front of the school in Morgan Hill, California, in the 1930s

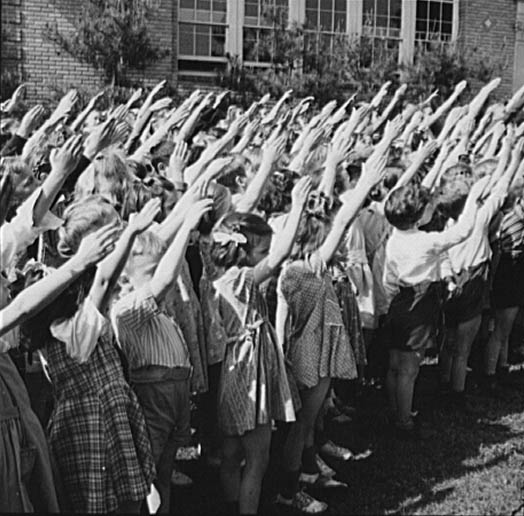
A group of U.S. schoolchildren pledging their allegiance to the flag, May 1942

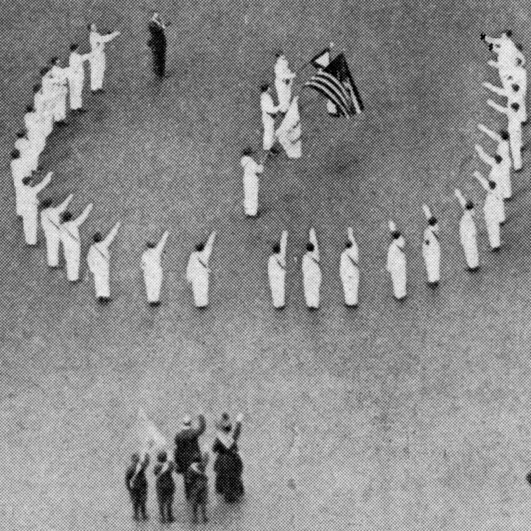
Bellamy salutes in 1917 at a Fifth Avenue ceremony opposite the Union League Club reviewing stand during the "Wake Up, America!" celebration, where thousands marched in the procession

== See also ==
- Ave
- Ave Imperator, morituri te salutant
- Bras d'honneur
- Heil og sæl
- Oath of the Horatii
- Olympic symbols § Olympic salute
- Quenelle (gesture)
- Raised fist
- Zogist salute
