= Ave =

Latin greeting, meaning "hail" or "be well"

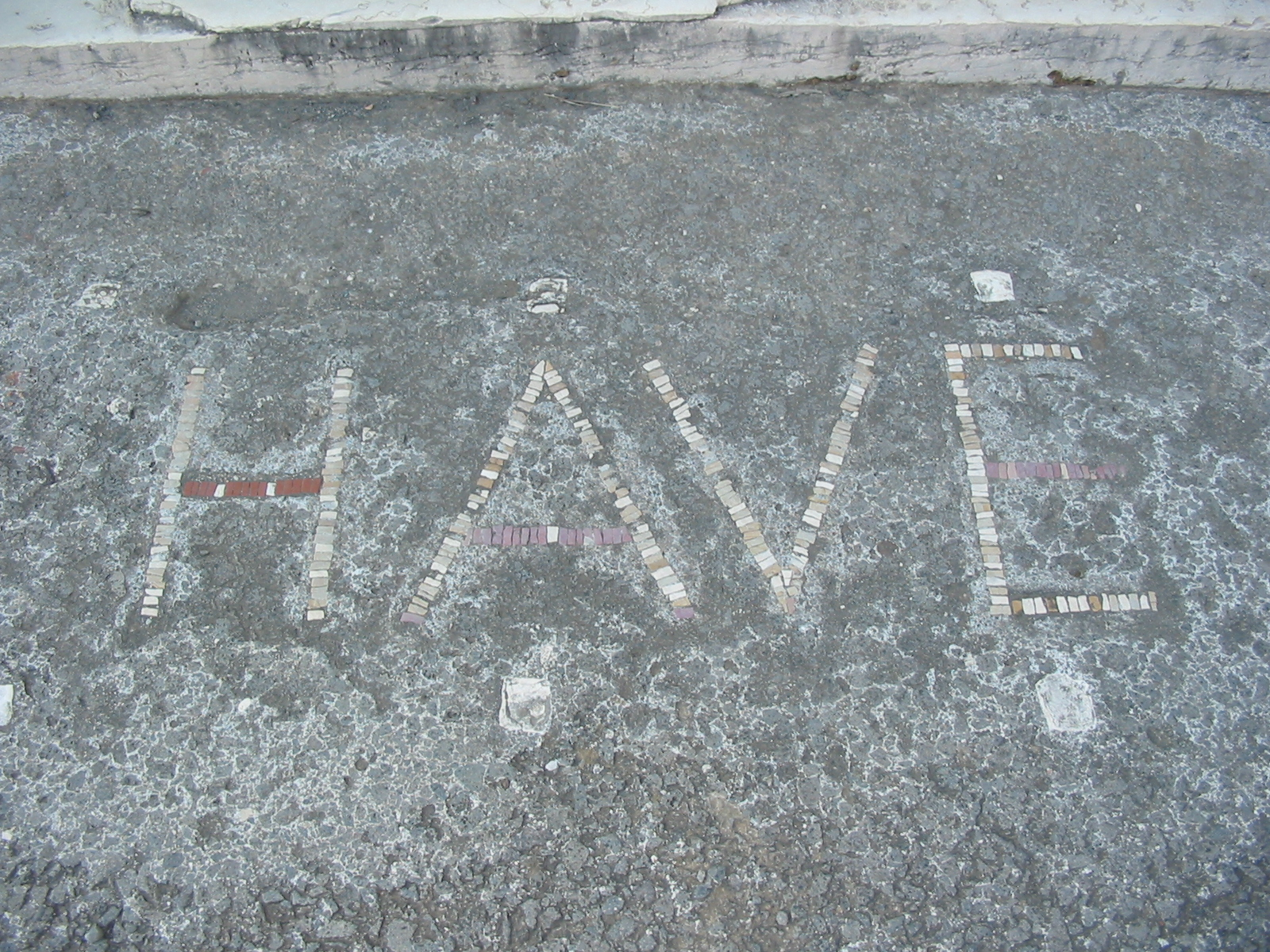
"HAVE" Mosaic outside the House of the Faun, Pompeii, reflecting the less formal variant of ave.

Ave is a Latin word, used by the Romans as a salutation and greeting, meaning 'hail'. It is the singular imperative form of the verb avēre, which meant 'to be well'; thus one could translate it literally as 'be well' or 'farewell'.

== Etymology ==
Ave is likely borrowed with an unspelled /h/ from Punic *ḥawe ('live!', 2SG. IMP.) The form might have been influenced by avē, the second-person singular present imperative of avēre (first-person aveō), meaning 'to be well/to fare well'. Indeed, its long vowel also ended up short via iambic shortening; this would explain the reluctance to spell the aspirate, as well as its interpretation as a verb form.

The word has been attested since Plautus.

== Use ==
The Classical Latin pronunciation of ave is [ˈaweː] (AH-way). As of the 1st century AD the greeting in general use across all classes of society had the form have (pronounced [ˈhawɛ] or perhaps [ˈhaβ̞ɛ]), with the aspirated initial syllable and the second syllable shortened, for which the most explicit description has been given by Quintilian in his Institutio Oratoria. While have would be grammatically improper in part because it has the "non-etymological" aspiration, centuries later all aspiration would instead disappear from popular speech, becoming a learned feature.

Ave in Ecclesiastical Latin is [ˈave], and in English, it tends to be pronounced /ˈɑːveɪ/ AH-vay.

The term was notably used to greet the Caesar or other authorities. Suetonius recorded that on one occasion, naumachiarii—captives and criminals fated to die fighting during mock naval encounters—addressed Claudius Caesar with the words "Ave Caesar! Morituri te salutant!" ('Hail, Caesar! Those who are about to die salute you!') in an attempt to avoid death. The expression is not recorded as being used in Roman times on any other occasion.

The Vulgate version of the Annunciation translates the salute of the angel to Mary, Mother of Jesus as "ave, gratia plena" ('Hail, full of grace'). The phrase "Hail Mary" (Ave Maria) is a Catholic Marian prayer that has inspired authors of religious music.

Fascist regimes during the 20th century also adopted the greeting. It was also distinctly used during the National Socialist Third Reich in the indirect German translation, heil.

Ave is not to be confused with Latin ave as the vocative singular of avus, meaning 'grandfather/forebear', or ave as the ablative singular of avis meaning 'bird'.

== See also ==
- Ave Imperator, morituri te salutant
- Bellamy salute
- Bras d'honneur
- Heil og sæl
- Quenelle (gesture)
- Raised fist
- Roman salute
- Zogist salute
