= Quenelle (gesture) =

Arm gesture created in 2005

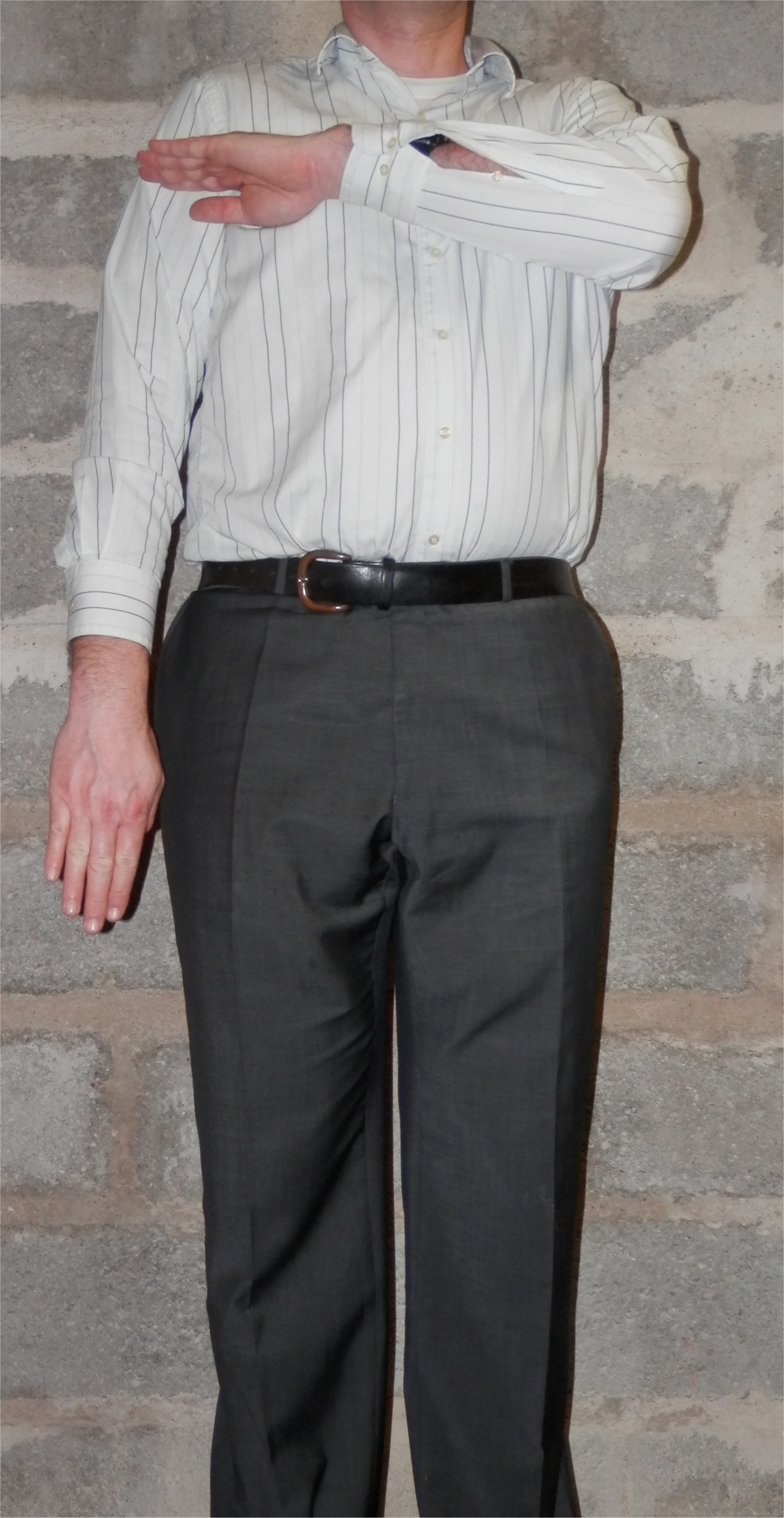
Quenelle gesture

The quenelle (/kəˈnɛl/, French pronunciation: [kənɛl]) is a gesture created and popularized by French comedian Dieudonné. He first used it in one of his sketches from a 2005 show entitled "1905" about French secularism, and has used it since in a wide variety of contexts. The quenelle became popular, with many photos posted to the Internet showing individuals posing while performing quenelles at mundane places (wedding parties, high school classes, etc.).

In late 2013, it was controversially used by professional footballer Nicolas Anelka during a match. Jewish leaders, anti-racism groups, and public officials in France have interpreted it as an inverted Nazi salute and as an expression of antisemitism. French officials have sought to ban the gesture due to its perceived subtext of antisemitism.

== Origin ==
A campaign poster for the 2009 election promoting the anti-Zionist list, featuring the quenelle gesture

The name quenelle comes from a dish of elongated fish balls, said to resemble a suppository. Hence, the phrase glisser une quenelle ('to slide a quenelle'), with a gesture evoking fisting practice, is similar to the English insults "up yours" and "up your arse/ass".

Dieudonné first used the quenelle gesture in his 2005 show named "1905", while talking about a dolphin. Dieudonné used the gesture in various contexts, including for his 2009 European election campaign poster for the "anti-Zionist party": he stated that his intention was "to put a quenelle into Zionism's butt".

=== Performance ===
The quenelle gesture is usually performed by pointing one arm vertically downwards palm down, while touching the shoulder with the opposite hand. Although the quenelle is usually done with the hand at shoulder level, it can also be done with different variations (e.g., elbow or wrist level).

Dieudonné described it as "a kind of up yours gesture to the establishment with an in the arse/ass dimension. But it's a quenelle, so it's a bit softer, less violent."

=== Antisemitic interpretation ===
The quenelle became popular, with many photos posted to the Internet showing individuals posing while performing quenelles at mundane places such as wedding parties, in high school classes, underwater, or in front of the Parc Astérix theme park.

Following an incident in which the quenelle gesture was used by French soldiers stationed outside a synagogue in the sixteenth arrondissement of Paris, the president of the International League against Racism and Anti-Semitism, Alain Jakubowicz, wrote an open letter to Defense Minister Jean-Yves Le Drian, dated September 9, 2013, in which he described the gesture as "an inverted Nazi salute representing the sodomy of the victims of the Holocaust". Dieudonné and his lawyers filed a lawsuit against the League on December 13, 2013.

Critics see quenelle salutes performed (and photographed) in front of prominent Holocaust landmarks and Jewish institutions as proof of the prejudiced intent of the gesture. Individuals have been photographed performing the gesture at the Auschwitz extermination camp, and Alain Soral performed a quenelle in front of the Holocaust Memorial in Berlin. One man subsequently sought by French police performed the quenelle at three locales connected to the murder of Jews: two at sites related to the March 2012 Toulouse shootings and the other near the Paris monument commemorating the Holocaust.

According to Jean-Yves Camus, a specialist in far-right politics, the quenelle is a "badge of identity, especially among the young, although it is difficult to say whether they really understand its meaning". Camus stated that Dieudonné has become the focus of a "broad movement that is anti-system and prone to conspiracy theories, but which has antisemitism as its backbone". Camus sees the quenelle as a gesture against the conspiracy theory of the existence of an international "Jewish conspiracy". For him, it is an antisemitic gesture that has nothing to do with the Nazi ideology.

Dieudonné describes himself as an anti-Zionist, but not an antisemite. He stated that the quenelle is a humorous "anti-system" gesture which has no association with antisemitism, and Suit against unknown, those who compare the quenelle to a Nazi salute. On January 23, 2014 Dieudonné subsequently described the gesture as also being a sign of "emancipation" for people descended from slaves. Officially, French authorities said the gesture is too vague for them to take any action against Dieudonné. However, an official January 2014 circular issued by the Interior Ministry specifically linked the quenelle gesture to antisemitism and extremism.

In August 2017, the Swiss Federal Supreme Court confirmed the conviction of three Geneva men for showing the quenelle in front of a synagogue, while partially masked and in military uniform. The men incurred a suspended monetary penalty for violating a Swiss law prohibiting acts of public racism.

== Notable uses ==
Various public figures such as the French basketball player Tony Parker, footballer Nicolas Anelka and National Front founder Jean-Marie Le Pen were pictured making the gesture. A new trend emerged, consisting of performing quenelles beside unwitting public figures identified as members of the establishment (such as Bernard-Henri Lévy, Pierre Bergé or Manuel Valls) or in front of the media's cameras. TV host Yann Barthès publicly apologized for quenelles made by someone in the audience during his show and revealed the identity of the author. Shortly afterwards, a picture of Yann Barthès himself performing a quenelle surfaced on social networks. Barthès argued that he did not know what he was doing when the picture was taken. Several people have been fired for having published photos of them performing quenelles and some people have been assaulted for the same reason. Two teenagers were arrested for having performed a quenelle at school.

While Dieudonné said in August 2013 that "the quenelle had taken on a life of its own and had become something he could no longer claim as his exclusively", his wife Noémie Montagne registered the quenelle as a trademark with the French National Industrial Property Institute.

=== By professional athletes ===
When French footballer Nicolas Anelka of West Bromwich Albion F.C. performed the quenelle to celebrate scoring a goal on 28 December 2013, the gesture became an international news story and one of the most searched terms on Google. Anelka described the gesture as anti-establishment rather than religious in nature, and said he did a quenelle as a "special dedication" to his friend Dieudonné. A subsequent statement released by West Bromwich said Anelka agreed not to perform the quenelle again, but nevertheless on 27 February 2014, Anelka was banned for five matches and fined £80,000 for this action. In response to the incident, club sponsor Zoopla announced that it would not continue its sponsorship deal with West Bromwich after the 2013–14 season. Dieudonné, who intended to visit and support Anelka in England, was banned from entry to the United Kingdom in February 2014. Anelka was dismissed by West Bromwich on 15 March 2014.

In November 2013, a photograph of French footballer Mamadou Sakho performing the quenelle with Dieudonné was discovered. Sakho said he had been tricked into making a quenelle without knowing its meaning, and that the photo had been taken six months earlier.

Following the Anelka incident, a photograph surfaced of former French professional basketball player Tony Parker, then playing for the San Antonio Spurs of the National Basketball Association (NBA), performing the quenelle alongside Dieudonné. Parker apologized, saying he did not know at the time that "it could be in any way offensive or harmful".

== French government reaction ==
On 23 December 2013, French President François Hollande said, "We will act, with the government led by prime minister Jean-Marc Ayrault, to shake the tranquility which, under the cover of anonymity, facilitates shameful actions online. But also we will fight against the sarcasm of those who purport to be humorists but are actually professional anti-Semites."

In a statement on 27 December 2013, France's Interior Minister Manuel Valls said he would consider "all legal means" to ban Dieudonné's "public meetings", given that he "addresses in an obvious and insufferable manner the memory of victims of the Shoah".

As Dieudonné continued to sprinkle usage of the quenelle on his website and in Internet postings, such as in his 2013 New Year's Eve video, the government took note. On 6 January 2014, Valls declared that performances considered antisemitic may be banned by local officials, and sent a three-page circular entitled "The Struggle Against Racism and Antisemitism – demonstrations and public reaction – performances by Mr. M'Bala M'Bala" to all prefects of Police in France. With respect to freedom of speech in France and banning scheduled performances ahead of time, Valls wrote, "The struggle against racism and antisemitism is an essential concern of government, and demands vigorous action." He took note of the liberty of expression in France, but went on to say that in exceptional circumstances, the police are invested with the power to prohibit an event if its intent is to prevent "a grave disturbance of public order" and cited the 1933 law supporting this. In addition, Valls specifically made reference to the quenelle, linking the quenelle gesture and quenelle trademark to Dieudonné's racist and antisemitic attitudes in his Internet publications.

=== Opposition parties ===
Most political parties in the opposition supported the government's ban—including the main conservative party (UMP) and the Greens, whose leader Eva Joly compared Dieudonné to Norwegian mass murderer Anders Behring Breivik.

The leader of the populist-right party National Front, Marine Le Pen, stated that she had "no opinion about the quenelle" and that politicians should speak about serious subjects such as unemployment, poverty or deindustrialization, not about quenelles. She later declared that the government's ban was similar to censorship.

== See also ==
Media related to Quenelle (gesture) at Wikimedia Commons

- Bellamy salute
- Bras d'honneur
- Dab (dance)
- Heil og sæl
- Olympic salute
- Raised fist
- Roman salute
- Zogist salute
- Elon Musk salute controversy
