= Heil og sæl =

Icelandic greeting

Heil og sæl in Icelandic and Norwegian (Old Norse: heill ok sæll, Old Swedish: hæl oc sæl, Early Modern Swedish: hell och säll), roughly meaning "healthy and happy", is an old Nordic greeting phrase which is still common on Iceland. It is comparable to English ”safe and sound”.

Beyond Iceland, the phrase was also used in Sweden, up until around the 19th century. During World War II, the phrase was also used by the Norwegian Nazi party, Nasjonal Samling, as a Norwegian equivalent to the Heil Hitler-salute.

== Etymology ==
Originally from Old Norse, the form heill ok sæll was used when addressed to a man, and heil ok sæl when addressed to a woman. Other versions were ver heill ok sæll (roughly "be healthy and happy" etc) and simply heill ("healthy" etc). The phrase in Old Swedish was liff hæl oc sæl (roughly "live healthy and safe" etc), and in Early Modern Swedish hell och säll, disappearing around the end of the 18th century or later.

The Norse adjective heill/heil (in later Nordic also hell, hel etc) is cognate to English adjective whole of the same meaning, including dated hale (“sound, healthy”). A related word is the Norse verb heila (in later Nordic also hela, hele, heile etc), which is cognate to the English verb heal of the same meaning (originally "to make whole"), stemming from the Germanic word stem *haila-, from which also the German verb heilen and the adjective „heile“, i.e. "functioning" / "not defective", descends.

The Norse adjective sæll/sæl (in later Nordic also säl, säll etc) is cognate to the now obsolete English adjective seel of the same meaning, meaning “safe, healthy, fortunate, happy” etc, or as a greeting “good fortune” and thereof. It is documented in Old English as *sǣle, albeit only in the negated variant unsǣle, meaning evil.

== 20th-century use ==
According to Store norske leksikon, the originally Norse greeting “heill ok sæll” was—adjusted to modern orthography and pronunciation—adopted as “heil og sæl” by the political party Nasjonal Samling. According to Bokmålsordboka, the adoption was inspired by Germany's “Heil Hitler” and similar.

During the 1940–1945 German occupation of Norway, Nasjonal Samling, being the governing and only legal political party, sought to introduce all parts of society to a greeting combining “heil og sæl” and a raised right hand. Whilst the attempt was not successful, the said greeting remained compulsory for party members and police. It has subsequently remained closely associated with nationalism.

== See also ==
- Ave
- Ave Imperator, morituri te salutant
- Bellamy salute
- Olympic salute
- Roman salute
- Zogist salute
