= Pledge of Allegiance to the Mexican Flag =

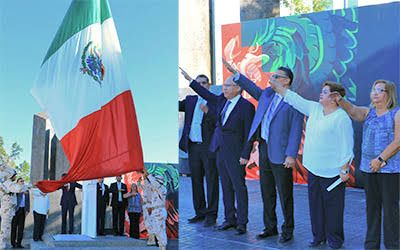
School board brings Roman salute to the Mexican flag

In Mexico, the Pledge of Allegiance takes part in the national honors ceremony to the national flag of Mexico, which is celebrated every Monday in basic, middle and higher education institutions.

When the pledge of allegiance is pronounced, the right hand is extended using the Roman salute, directing it to the flag in a 30-45 degree angle and, if necessary, turning the body in the direction of it.

Despite being common in educational institutions in Mexico, it is not part of the official flag ceremony protocols.

== Text ==
Spanish	English translation
Bandera de México, legado de nuestros héroes, símbolo de la unidad de nuestros padres y nuestros hermanos, te prometemos ser siempre fieles a los principios de libertad y de justicia que hacen de nuestra Patria la nación independiente, humana y generosa a la que entregamos nuestra existencia. Firmes, ya. (Termina el saludo romano)	Flag of Mexico, legacy of our heroes, symbol of the unity of our parents and our brothers, we promise to be always faithful to the principles of freedom and justice that make our Homeland the independent, humane and generous nation to which we give our existence. Steady now. (Roman salute ends).
