= Bustuarius =

Type of Roman gladiator

A bustuarius (plural: bustuarii) was a kind of gladiator in Ancient Rome, who fought about the funeral pyre (Latin: bustum) of the deceased at a Roman funeral.

Bustuarii were considered of even lower status than other gladiators whose fights were exhibited in public gladiatorial games. Bustuarii are mentioned by Cicero in his Against Piso speech, criticizing Lucius Calpurnius Piso Caesoninus before the Senate and comparing Publius Clodius Pulcher to a bustuarius gladiator. Tertullian, alleges in his treatise attacking ancient Roman religion in favour of Christianity – On Spectacles – that the origin of gladiatorial games was these funerary rituals. The word could also refer to a gravedigger or cremation attendant.

At first, the practice was to sacrifice captives on the tomb, or at the bustum of warriors: instances of which are in Homer – at the funeral of Patroclus – and in Greek tragedy. Their blood was supposed to appease the di inferi or the manes, gods and spirits of the underworld, and render them propitious to the remains of the deceased. In later ages, this custom appeared too barbarous; and in lieu of these victims, they appointed gladiators to fight, whose blood, it was supposed, might have the same effect.

== See also ==
- List of Roman amphitheatres
- Military of ancient Rome
- Slavery in ancient Rome
- Sword and Sandal
