= Wake Up, America! =

Song
- Released: 1916
- Recorded: March 10, 1916
- Length: 4:18
- Label: Victor
- Composer(s): Jack Glogau
- Lyricist(s): George Graff, Jr.

"Wake up, America!" is a World War I song written in 1916. George Graff, Jr. wrote the lyrics, and Jack Glogau composed the music. The song was published by Leo Feist, Inc. in New York City.

The character of Uncle Sam, whose image was used to recruit soldiers for war, is featured on the cover of the sheet music. Uncle Sam puts a ship into the sea, as soldiers march in the background. Above the title of the song, it reads, "This is the song that inspired all America!"
