= Ave Imperator, morituri te salutant =

Latin salutation

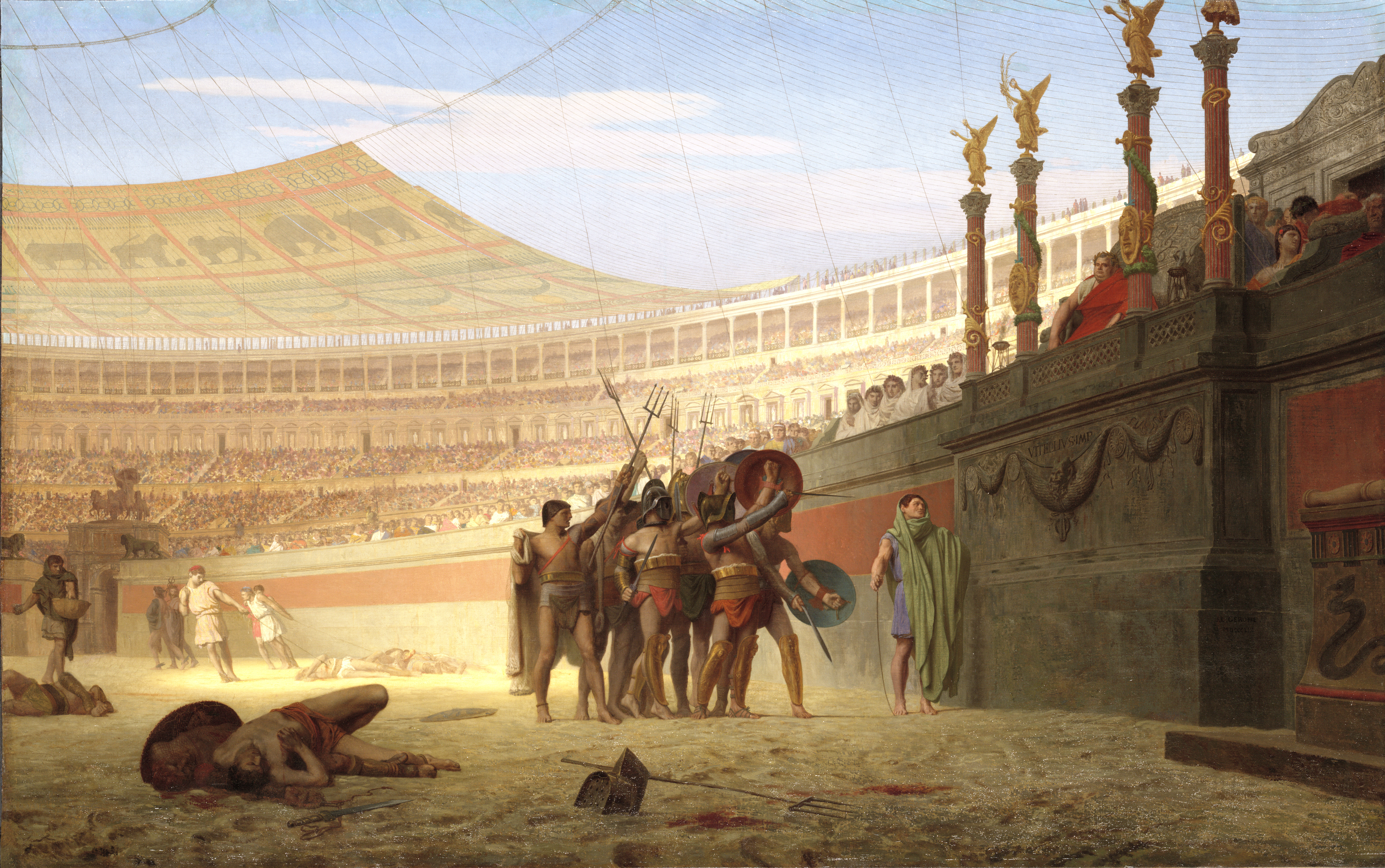
Ave Caesar! Morituri te salutant, by Jean-Léon Gérôme (1859), adapts the phrase to describe gladiators greeting the emperor Vitellius

Avē Imperātor, moritūrī tē salūtant ("Hail, Emperor, those who are about to die salute you") is a well-known Latin phrase quoted in Suetonius, De vita Caesarum ("The Life of the Caesars", or "The Twelve Caesars"). It was reportedly used during an event in AD 52 on Lake Fucinus by naumachiarii—captives and criminals fated to die fighting during mock naval encounters—in the presence of the emperor Claudius. Suetonius reports that Claudius replied "Aut nōn" ("or not").

Variant components in the exchange include "Have" as the first word instead of "Avē", as well as the alternate wordings "Avē Caesar" and "Moritūrī tē salūtāmus"—the latter in the 1st person ("We who are about to die salute you")—and a response in 15th-century texts of "Avete vos" ("Fare you well").

Despite its popularization in later times, the phrase is not recorded elsewhere in Roman history. Historians question whether it was ever used as a salute. It was more likely an isolated appeal by desperate captives and criminals condemned to die, and noted by Roman historians in part for the unusual mass reprieve granted by Claudius to the survivors.

== Historical source material ==
The source material comes from the works of three Roman historians, who were all born after the events of 52 AD. Suetonius (c. 69–75 to after 130, probably writing around AD 121), and Cassius Dio (around 155–164 to after 229, probably writing 200–22) both wrote about the event and quoted the phrase. Tacitus (c. 56–117, writing from around 98 to 117) mentions the event but does not quote the phrase.

The first known record of the phrase is in the writings of Suetonius (here with apices for legibility):

...quín [Claudius] et émissúrus Fúcinum lacum naumachiam ante commísit. Sed cum próclámantibus naumachiáriís: "Have imperátor, moritúrí té salútant!" respondisset: "Aut nón," neque post hanc vócem quasi veniá datá quisquam dímicáre vellet, diú cúnctátus an omnés igní ferróque absúmeret, tandem é séde suá prósiluit ac per ambitum lacús nón sine foedá vacillátióne discurréns partim minandó partim adhortandó ad pugnam compulit. Hóc spectáculó classis Sicula et Rhodia concurrérunt, duodénárum trirémium singulae...

Even when he [Claudius] was on the point of letting out the water from Lake Fucinus he gave a sham sea-fight first. But when the combatants cried out: "Hail, emperor, they who are about to die salute thee," he replied, "Or not," and after that all of them refused to fight, maintaining that they had been pardoned. Upon this he hesitated for some time about destroying them all with fire and sword, but at last leaping from his throne and running along the edge of the lake with his ridiculous tottering gait, he induced them to fight, partly by threats and partly by promises. At this performance a Sicilian and a Rhodian fleet engaged, each numbering twelve triremes...

The same incident is described in the writings of Cassius Dio, a Roman consul and historian who wrote in Greek. In Book 60 of his Roman History he states:

Claudius conceived the desire to exhibit a naval battle on a certain lake; so, after building a wooden wall around it and erecting stands, he assembled an enormous multitude. Claudius and Nero were arrayed in military garb, while Agrippina wore a beautiful chlamys woven with threads of gold, and the rest of the spectators whatever pleased their fancy. Those who were to take part in the sea-fight were condemned criminals, and each side had fifty ships, one part being styled "Rhodians" and the other "Sicilians." First they assembled in a single body and all together addressed Claudius in this fashion: "Hail, Emperor! We who are about to die salute thee [χαῖρε, αὐτοκράτορ· οἱ ἀπολούμενοί σε ἀσπαζόμεθα]." And when this in no wise availed to save them and they were ordered to fight just the same, they simply sailed through their opponents' lines, injuring each other as little as possible. This continued until they were forced to destroy one another.

=== Source variations and interpretation ===
The person of the main verb differs in the two sources. Suetonius quotes it with a third-person plural verb (salūtant, meaning "they/those salute/greet"), and Cassius quotes it with a first-person plural verb (ἀσπαζόμεθα, meaning "we salute/greet"). Apart from this, the Latin and Greek expressions have the same meaning.

Claudius' response is given in some editions of Suetonius as "Avēte vōs!" ("Fare you well!"), suggesting an act of favor. The earliest editions of De Vita Caesarum published in Rome in 1470 and Venice in 1471 used "Avēte vōs," but this version was still accepted in the nineteenth century, as can be seen in the Baumgarten-Crusius edition of 1816. Karl Ludwig Roth returned to the better quality manuscripts for his 1857 edition—chiefly the ninth-century Codex Memmianus, the oldest known extant version of Suetonius' work—and corrected Claudius' reported response to "Aut nōn". John C. Rolfe notes both responses, describing them as "one of Claudius' feeble jokes, which the combatants pretended to understand as meaning that they need not risk their lives in battle". Donald Kyle describes it as a possible attempt at a witticism. Joseph Pike states in his notes on Roth's text:

The reading 'Avēte vōs' is from the fifteenth century manuscripts and editions. In this case the emperor is simply returning the salutation. The literal meaning is, however, 'be well', 'be safe', or 'be sound', and the gladiators understood it as dismissing them.

Basil Kennett, writing in 1820, describes the "Avete vos" response as a cruel jest: "[W]hen they would gladly have interpreted it as an act of favour, and a grant of their lives, he soon gave them to understand that it proceeded from the contrary principle of barbarous cruelty, and insensibility."

=== Cultural background ===
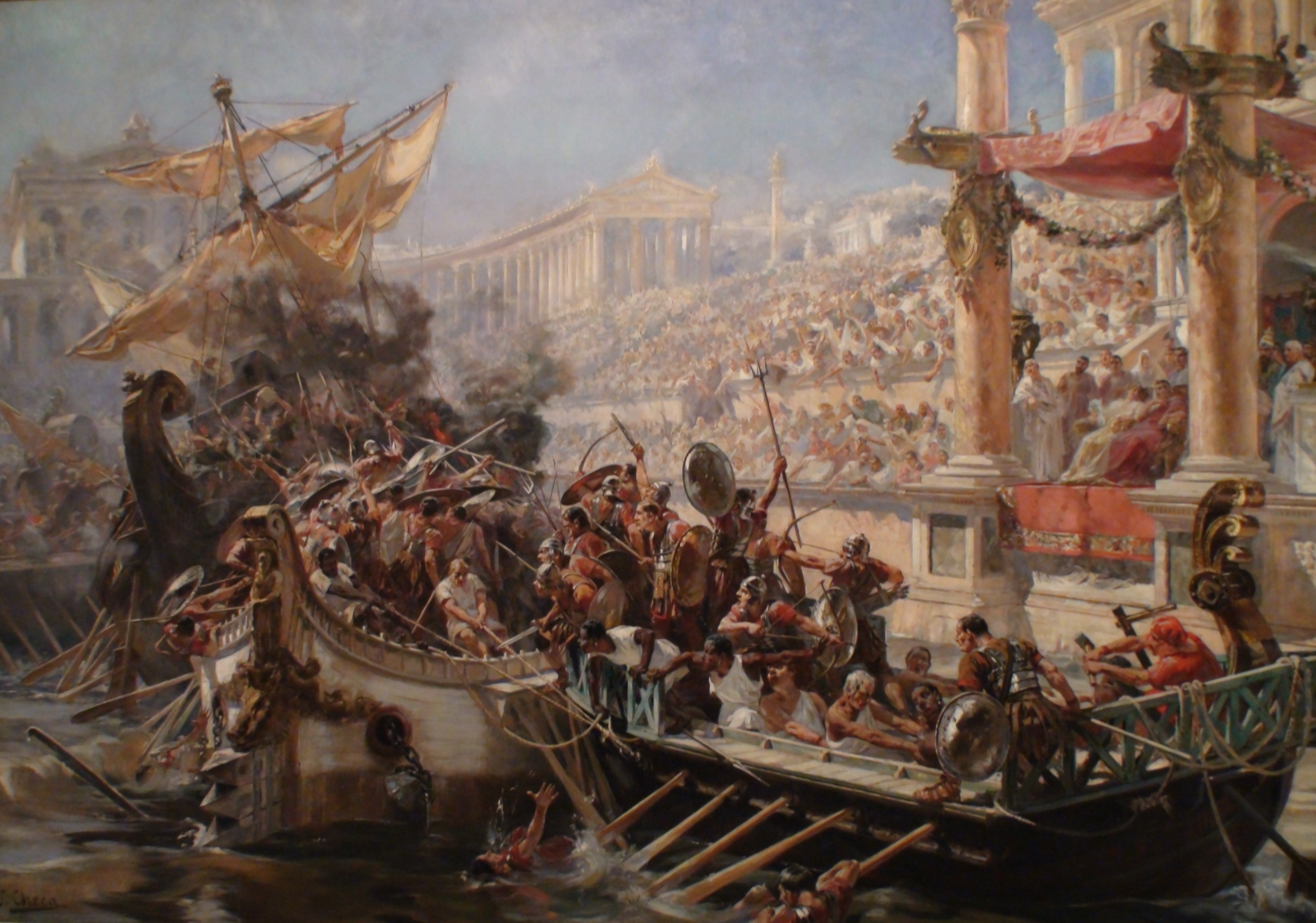
La Naumaquia (detail): an imaginative recreation by Ulpiano Checa, first exhibited in Paris in 1894

Claudius, the fourth Roman Emperor of the Julio-Claudian dynasty, ruled the Roman Empire following Caligula's death in AD 41 until his death in AD 54. According to Suetonius, Claudius was extraordinarily fond of the games. He is said to have risen with the crowd after gladiatorial matches and given unrestrained praise to the fighters, and he was criticized for not leaving the arena during the executions as was the custom among the noble classes.

Claudius also presided over many new and original events. Soon after coming into power, Claudius instituted games to be held in honor of his father, Nero Claudius Drusus, on the latter's birthday. Annual games were also held in honor of his accession, and took place at the Praetorian camp where Claudius had first been proclaimed emperor.

Claudius celebrated the Secular games—a religious festival that had been revived by Augustus—to mark the 800th anniversary of the founding of Rome. He also on at least one occasion participated in a wild animal hunt himself according to Pliny the Elder, setting out with the Praetorian cohorts to fight a killer whale which was trapped in the harbor of Ostia.

Public entertainments varied from combat between just two gladiators, to large-scale events with potentially thousands of deaths. The naumachia (also called navalia proelia by the Romans) was one of the latter, a large-scale and bloody spectacular combative event taking place on many ships and held in large lakes or flooded arenas. Prisoners of war and criminals condemned to die were tasked with enacting naval battles to the death for public entertainment. Those selected were known as naumachiarii.

Unlike gladiatorial combats, naumachiae were infrequently held—they were usually only called to celebrate notable events. Julius Caesar held an event with 6,000 naumachiarii in the lesser Codeta, a marshy area by the Tiber, to celebrate his fourth victory to be honored by triumph. Cassius Dio writes of two naumachiae that Titus held during the inaugural games of the Flavian Amphitheater, including an event of 3,000 men enacting a battle between the Athenians and the Syracusans; and Domitian held a naumachia in which Dio reports "practically all the combatants and many of the spectators as well perished".

The naumachia called by Claudius celebrated the completion of a drainage work and agricultural land reclamation project at Italy's largest inland lake, Lake Fucino, an 11-mile (19 km) long crater lake in the Central Apennine mountain range located around 50 miles (80 km) from Rome. The project, which took eleven years to complete and employed 30,000 men, included the leveling of a hill top and the construction of a 3-mile (4.8 km) tunnel between the lake and the river Liri (Lat. Liris). The tunnel has been described as "the greatest Roman tunnel" (Encyclopedia Americana) despite initially only achieving partial success, and was the longest such tunnel until the construction of that of Mont Cenis in 1876. According to the Annals of Tacitus:

in order that the impressive character of the work might be viewed by a larger number of visitants, a naval battle was arranged upon the lake itself, on the model of an earlier spectacle given by Augustus – though with light vessels and a smaller force [...]"

In a footnote to a 2008 publication of Tacitus' Annals, it is noted that "such an amount of criminals [19,000 according to Tacitus and other sources] may probably represent the sweepings of the provinces as well as of Rome and Italy; but even on this supposition the number, as Friedländer remarks (ii, 324), is suggestive of iniquitous condemnations".

=== Description of the event by Tacitus ===
According to Tacitus (writing around 50 years after the event):

Claudius equipped triremes, quadriremes, and nineteen thousand combatants: the lists he surrounded with rafts, so as to leave no unauthorized points of escape, but reserved space enough in the centre to display the vigour of the rowing, the arts of the helmsmen, the impetus of the galleys, and the usual incidents of an engagement. On the rafts were stationed companies and squadrons of the praetorian cohorts, covered by a breastwork from which to operate their catapults and ballistae: the rest of the lake was occupied by marines with decked vessels. The shores, the hills, the mountain-crests, formed a kind of theatre, soon filled by an untold multitude, attracted from the neighbouring towns, and in part from the capital itself, by curiosity or by respect for the sovereign. He and Agrippina presided, the one in a gorgeous military cloak, the other – not far distant – in a Greek mantle of cloth of gold. The battle, though one of criminals [sontes], was contested with the spirit and courage of freemen; and, after much blood had flowed, the combatants were exempted from destruction [occidioni].

== Usage in Roman times ==
H. J. Leon of the University of Texas considered this salutation in the Transactions of the American Philological Association in 1939. He observed that the salute had become widely represented and embellished in "numerous works dealing with Roman antiquities, so that it has become one of the best known and most often cited of Roman customs". It was recognized in lay and academic writings as a customary salute of gladiators to the emperor. And yet "there is no other ancient reference to a salute of the gladiators, and in this case it was uttered not by gladiators at all, but by naumachiarii." A striking example of this pervasive belief even in academia can be found in historian Jérôme Carcopino's 1940 book La vie Quotidienne à Rome à l’Apogée de l’Empire (Daily Life in Ancient Rome: The People and the City at the Height of the Empire). In this book the author, a member of the Académie française, professor at Le Havre and the Sorbonne, and Director of the French Academy in Rome, cites the phrase and writes in vivid and poetic detail of the gladiators' "melancholy salutation" as they parade past the emperor prior to entering the Colosseum.

Following a review of the source material related to the AD 52 naumachia, Leon observes that the fighters were not gladiators but were convicted criminals sentenced to death. Their intended fate was occidioni (massacre, or slaughter). The lake had been surrounded with "rafts" to prevent a mass breakout and was surrounded by "the crack soldiers of the praetorian guard, both infantry and cavalry, who were protected by ramparts and equipped with catapults and ballistae, and further reinforced by ships bearing marines ready for action". He concludes that this was not a formal salute, but in all likelihood an isolated incident of a mass plea for sympathy or mercy by desperate convicted men sentenced to death on a specific occasion, and that

[c]ombining the three accounts, we can reasonably assume that, condemned as they were to die, these convicts invoked Claudius with their "Morituri te salutant", which was not a regular and formal salute, but an appeal used only on that occasion in the hope of winning the Emperor's sympathy. When he replied "Aut non", they took his words as meaning "aut non morituri" [or not die] and indicating pardon – Suetonius says "quasi venia data" – and refused to fight, but finally yielded either to the entreaties of the Emperor or to force, and fought bravely until the survivors were excused from further slaughter.

My conclusion is, accordingly, that there is no evidence whatever for the much-quoted salute of the gladiators. The only two ancient references, those in Suetonius and in Dio, refer not to gladiators but to naumachiarii, men condemned to die, and even these references are to one specific episode, the circumstances of which indicate that the supposed salute was not even a regular salute of the naumachiarii.

Alan Baker broadly agrees, stating, "There is no evidence that this was common practice among gladiators. As far as we know, the only time this phrase was used was at an event staged by Claudius." Plass notes that "it is hard to see why or how the phrase came to be used on this occasion if it was not a regular formula. On the other hand, if it was something that Claudius might expect to hear it would more naturally serve in its role as a feed line for his repartee portraying his invincible gaucherie." He comments on the distancing effect of the Latin source and the first person of the Greek source and notes that the interpretation and response by the fighters "seems to be a maneuver within rules governing clemency in the arena".

Kyle concurs that no other sources record the "supposed gladiator salute" in any other context "and it did not come here from true gladiators". Treated as a commodity, they were not elite gladiators but captives and criminals doomed to die, who usually fought until all were killed. When the salute or appeal failed, and they were forced to kill one another in earnest,

[a]cting with some initiative and inventing a pseudo-gladiatorial salute, and then fighting well, these men, despite their criminal and non-professional status and their intended extermination, atypically turned themselves into proper gladiators for a day. Hence some survived.

He concludes that "[t]he sources remark on the incident, in part, because it was an anomaly in arena practice—a mass Androclean reprieve."

== Usage in modern times ==
The story was well known in the 20th century, and indeed appears in George Bernard Shaw's 1912 play Androcles and the Lion immediately before the Christians face the lions as "Hail, Caesar! those about to die salute thee", with the Emperor responding "Good morrow, friends". As well as taking root in modern conceptions of Roman customs, the phrase has passed into contemporary culture, including use by military pilots such as John Lerew, two unrelated World War II films entitled Morituri (released 1948 and 1965), an episode of M*A*S*H entitled "Peace on Us", the French comic book Asterix by René Goscinny and Albert Uderzo, a Marvel comic of the 1980s called Strikeforce: Morituri that focused on superheroes who were inevitably going to die, the Adventure Time episode "Morituri Te Salutamus", the Jurassic World: Chaos Theory episode "Morituri Te Salutant", a set of one-act plays of the 1890s by Hermann Sudermann, Joseph Conrad's canonical 1902 novel Heart of Darkness, James Joyce's novel Ulysses, spoken by the main antagonist, Mr. Brown, shortly before his death in Agatha Christie's 1922 novel The Secret Adversary, as well as mentioned in the epilogue of Christie's book A Caribbean Mystery (1964), in popular music of the 1980s, as well as music in video games, in the paper title of peer-reviewed medical research, in a political maiden speech, market commentary during the 2008 financial crisis and in modern art, fiction, non-fiction and poetry related to the Roman period.

In the 2000 film Gladiator, Proximo's squad of gladiators recite the phrase in unison before the emperor Commodus - all except for Maximus, who remains silent. Later in the film, the former gladiator Tigris the Gaul (played by Sven-Ole Thorsen), brought back from his retirement to kill Maximus, also addresses the emperor with the phrase, with Maximus once again defiantly refusing to do so.

Those Who Are About to Die Salute You – Morituri Te Salutant is the debut album by Colosseum, released in 1969 by Fontana. It is one of the pioneering albums of jazz fusion.

For Those About to Rock (We Salute You) (referred to as For Those About to Rock on the cover) is the eighth studio album by Australian hard rock band AC/DC.

It appears in the short story "Old Bugs" written by H.P. Lovecraft in late 1919.

It appears in the party scene in 1950's film, “All About Eve”: “Margo: [to Bill] You be the host. It's your party. Happy birthday, welcome home, and we who are about to die salute you.”

The 2024 show Those About to Die, which is centered on gladiators, is named as a reference to the phrase.

== Writing and pronunciation ==
Written with optional macrons: Avē Imperātor (Cæsar), moritūrī tē salūtant.

Classical Latin pronunciation: [ˈaweː ɪmpeˈraːtor (ˈkae̯sar) moriˈtuːriː teː saˈluːtant]

== See also ==
- Bustuarius
- List of Roman amphitheatres
- Military of ancient Rome
- Slavery in ancient Rome
- Sword and Sandal
