= Bras d'honneur =

Obscene gesture used to express contempt

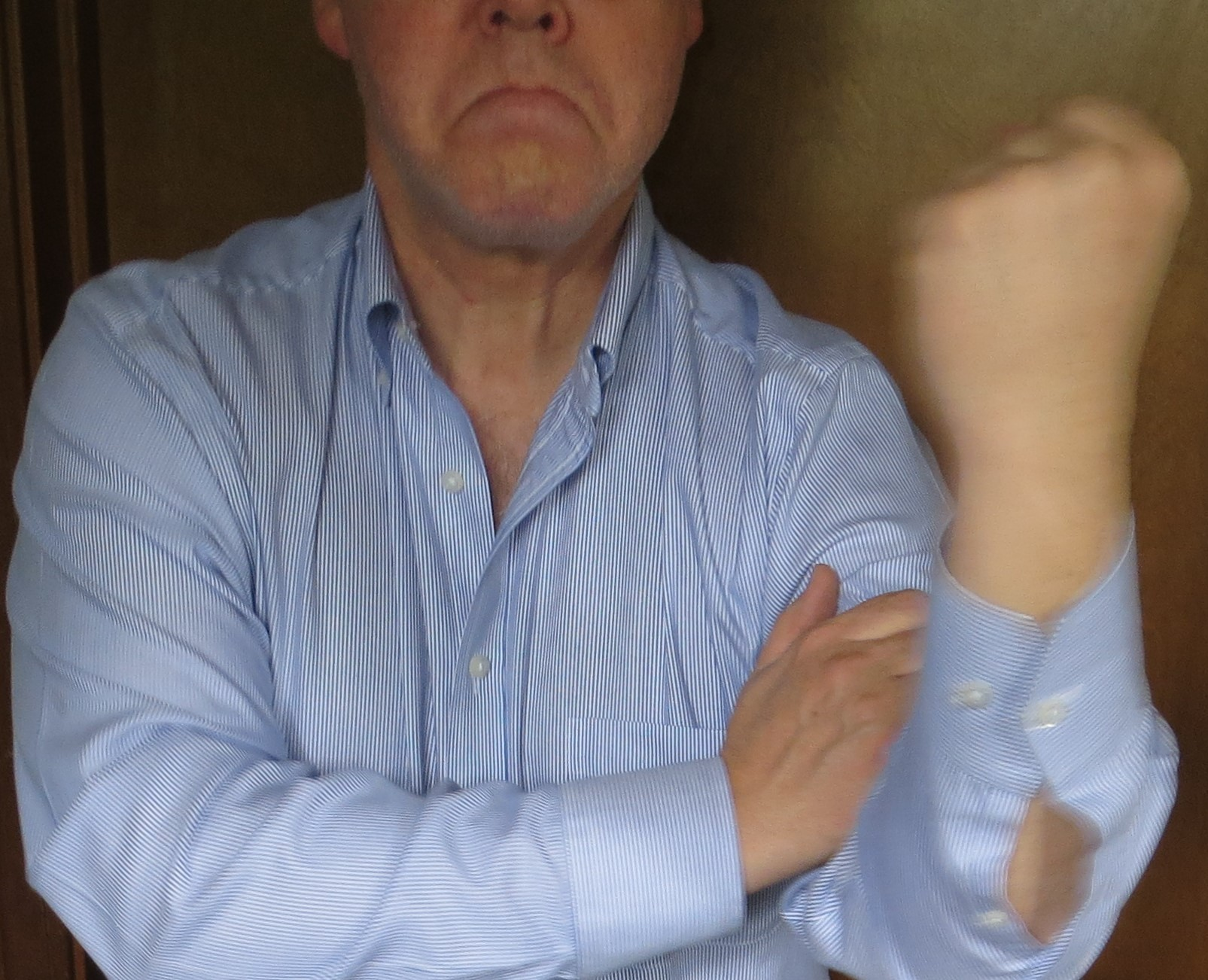
Physical demonstration of the bras d'honneur gesture

Bras d'honneur (from French; lit. 'arm of honor') is an obscene gesture used to express contempt. It is roughly equivalent in meaning to phrases like "fuck you" or "up yours", similar to the finger gesture.

It is most common in the Romance-speaking world (Spain, Italy, France, Portugal, Romania, Belgium, Latin America, and Québec), Russia, Poland, Hungary, Bulgaria, Croatia, Serbia, Turkey, Georgia, Ireland, Tunisia, Egypt, Algeria, and parts of Scotland and Ethiopia.

To perform the gesture, an arm is bent in an L-shape, with the fist pointing upwards. The other hand grips or slaps the biceps of the bent arm as it is emphatically raised to a vertical position.

The bras d'honneur is known by various names in different languages, including the Iberian slap, (Note: Spanish: corte de manga, lit. 'sleeve cut'; Portuguese: manguito; Catalan: botifarra, lit. 'sausage'.) forearm jerk, Italian salute, (Note: Italian: gesto dell'ombrello, lit. 'umbrella gesture'.) or Kozakiewicz's gesture. (Note: Polish: gest Kozakiewicza or wał.)

== Use and names by country ==
- In Italy, the gesture is often referred to as gesto dell'ombrello, meaning literally 'umbrella gesture'. Its most famous occurrence in Italian cinema is in Federico Fellini's I vitelloni (1953), where the idler played by Alberto Sordi jeers at a group of workmen, combining this gesture with a raspberry.
- In Brazil, the gesture is known as a "banana" and carries the same connotation as giving someone the middle finger. It can also be used to denote disrespectfully ignoring what someone just said, analogous in meaning to the expression, "I don't give a fuck".
- In Japan, the gesture has a positive connotation, often used to convey courage or determination in a similar manner to a fist pump. To perform the gesture, a hand is placed on the opposite biceps, and then the biceps is flexed, as if the flexed biceps were being polished. Sometimes, the gesture appears in video games produced in the country; as a result, it often has to be removed during the process of game localisation to avoid causing offence.
- Portugal has the term manguito, a diminutive of manga 'sleeve'. It is also the most characteristic gesture performed by the Portuguese everyman Zé Povinho.
- In Poland, the gesture is known as wał or gest Kozakiewicza ('Kozakiewicz's gesture') after Władysław Kozakiewicz, who famously displayed this gesture after breaking the world record and winning the gold medal in the pole vault at the 1980 Summer Olympics in front of a hostile crowd in Moscow. (In Russia, this gesture is widely understood as a manlier, more "native", and more publicly acceptable version of the foreign "middle finger" gesture, but both of them are rarely used compared to the fig sign and verbal insults.) This coincided with the rise of the Solidarity Union in Poland in 1980.
- In Bosnia and Herzegovina and Croatia, the gesture is known as bosanski grb ('Bosnian coat-of-arms') after the territorial coat of arms of Bosnia during the Austro-Hungarian reign, that is somewhat similar to the actual gesture. The gesture is also called od šake do lakta ('from the fist to the elbow').
- In Tunisia, it is called faggousa and it is done the same way.
- In Morocco, it is performed with a closed fist with the knuckle side pointing towards the ground, and the side of the forearm facing down is held with the palm of the opposite hand. It is also, in most cases, done quite aggressively, and as to produce a "clap" from the palm hitting the forearm.
- In Malta, the gesture is called il-qtugħ tal-idejn, which literally means "the chopping of hands/arms". It carries the same connotation as giving someone the middle finger. In fact it can also be used together with the middle finger for extra effect, combining two gestures into one.
- In Scotland, the gesture is known to mean 'Get it up ye' which is a phrase often used in a smug way to describe a victory or as a way of making a valid point, or it can simply mean something similar to 'Up yours'.
