= Zogist salute =

Albanian nationalist salute

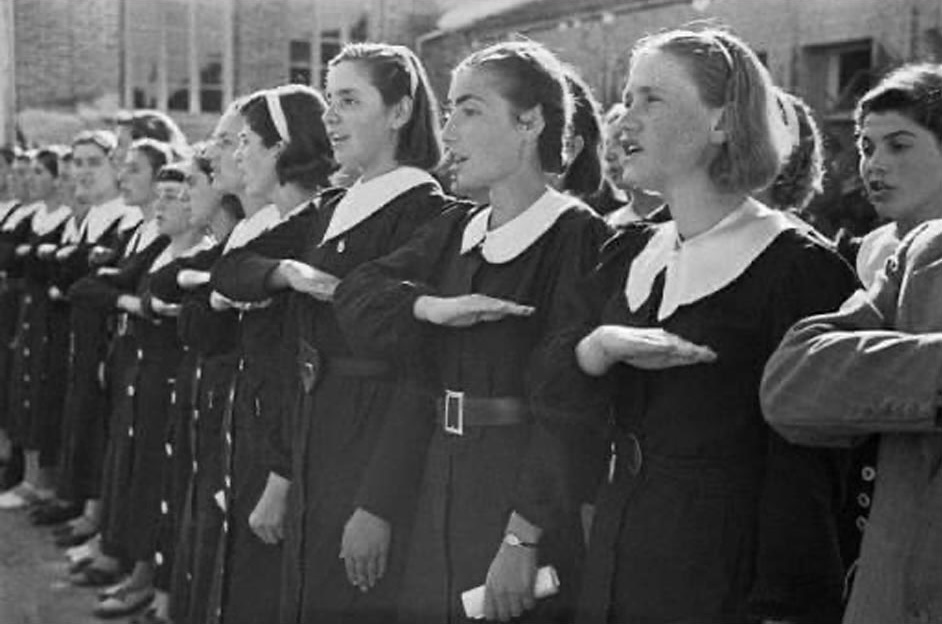
School girls from the Instituti Femnor "Nana Mbretneshë" performing the Zogist salute

The Zogist salute (Albanian: Përshëndetja zogiste) is an Albanian nationalist military salute since used by civilians in other countries. The salute is a gesture whereby the right hand is placed over the heart, with the palm facing downwards.

The salute is still popular with modern supporters of Zogu and Albanian monarchists in general, and the Albanian nationalists of the Balli Kombëtar. Under the post-war communist government of Enver Hoxha, the Zogist salute was used by dissidents as an anti-regime statement.

== History ==
The distinctive gesture was instituted as a salute by King Ahmad Muhtar Zog. It was first widely used by King Zog's personal police force and was later adopted by the Royal Albanian Army.

Leo Freundlich, when confronted by the Nazi greeting "Heil Hitler", would respond with a "Heil Zogu" salute, leading the German diplomats to believe it was a standard Albanian greeting.

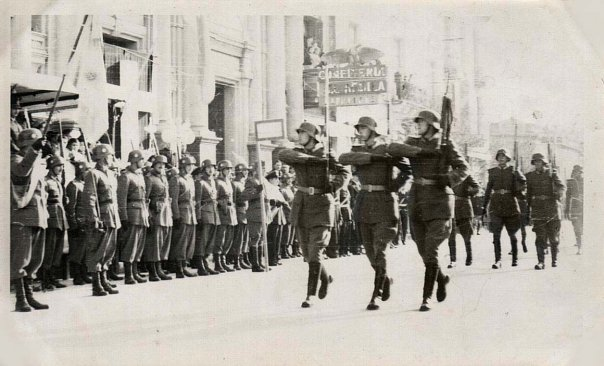
