= Nazi salute =

Greeting gesture used in Nazi Germany

Adolf Hitler saluting at a 1935 Nazi Party rally in Nuremberg

The Nazi salute, also known as the fascist salute, Hitler salute (Note: German: Hitlergruß, lit. 'Hitler greeting', IPA: [ˈhɪtlɐˌɡʁuːs], also called by the Nazi Party deutscher Gruß, 'German greeting', IPA: [ˈdɔʏtʃɐ ˈɡʁuːs]) or the Sieg Heil salute, is a gesture that was used as a greeting in Nazi Germany. The salute is performed by raising and extending the right arm forward at an upward angle with a straightened hand, fingers together, and palm facing downward. The salute is usually accompanied by a cry of "Heil Hitler!" ('Hail Hitler!'), (Note: IPA: [ˌhaɪl ˈhɪtlɐ]) "Heil, mein Führer!" ('Hail, my leader!'), or "Sieg Heil!" ('Hail victory!'). (Note: IPA: [ziːk haɪ̯l])

Inspired by the Roman salute used by members of the Italian National Fascist Party, the Nazi salute was officially adopted by the Nazi Party in 1926, although it had been used within the party as early as 1923 to signal obedience to the party's leader, Adolf Hitler, and to glorify the German nation (and later the German war effort). The salute was mandatory for civilians but mostly optional for military personnel, who retained a traditional military salute until the failed assassination attempt on Hitler on 20 July 1944.

Use of the salute is illegal in modern-day Germany, where associated phrases are also forbidden, although exemptions are made for its ironic use to mock the Nazi greeting. It is also illegal in Austria and Slovakia. In Canada, much of Europe, and Australia, the salute is forbidden except under circumstances that do not promote Nazi ideology.

== Description ==
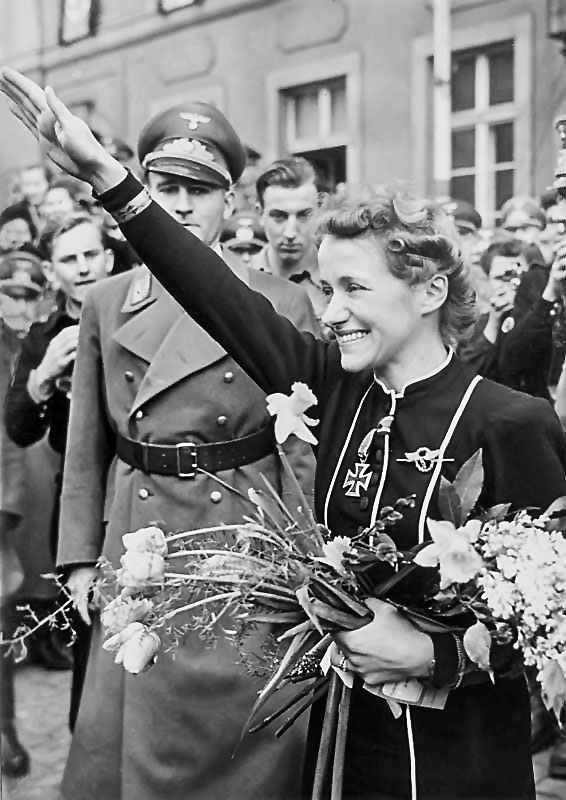
Nazi test pilot Hanna Reitsch saluting in 1941

The salute was executed by extending the right arm stiff to an upward 45° angle and then straightening the hand so that it is in the same direction and slope as the arm. Usually, an utterance of "Sieg Heil", "Heil Hitler!", or "Heil!" accompanied the gesture. If one saw an acquaintance at a distance, it was enough to simply raise the right hand. If one encountered a superior, one would also say "Heil Hitler". If physical disability prevented raising the right arm, it was acceptable to raise the left.

=== Hitler's use ===
Hitler gave a right-armed salute with variations. He used the typical stiff-armed salute when reviewing his troops or when facing crowds, but sometimes held at more of a right angle. To return a salute, he raised his arm with the elbow bent back and his palm facing up.

== Origins and adoption ==
The spoken greeting "Heil" became popular in the pan-German movement around 1900. It was used by the followers of Georg Ritter von Schönerer, head of the Austrian Alldeutsche Partei ('Pan-German Party') who considered himself leader of the Austrian Germans, and who was described by Carl E. Schorske as "The strongest and most thoroughly consistent anti-Semite that Austria produced" before the coming of Hitler. Hitler took both the "Heil" greeting – which was popularly used in his "hometown" of Linz when he was a boy – and the title of "Führer" for the head of the Nazi Party from Schönerer, whom he admired.

The extended arm saluting gesture was alleged to be based on an ancient Roman custom, but no known Roman work of art depicts it, nor does any extant Roman text describe it. Historians have instead determined that the gesture originated from Jacques-Louis David's 1784 painting Oath of the Horatii, which displayed a raised arm salutatory gesture in an ancient Roman setting. The gesture and its identification with ancient Rome was advanced in other French neoclassic art.

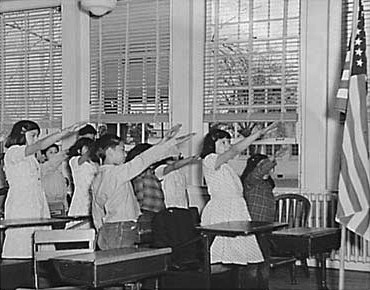
From 1892 to 1942, the similar Bellamy salute was raised during the United States Pledge of Allegiance.

In 1892, Christian socialist minister Francis Bellamy revised the United States Pledge of Allegiance, which was to be accompanied by a visually similar salute. Years after the introduction of the Nazi salute, in 1942 the U.S. introduced a hand-over-the-heart gesture for civilian use during the Pledge of Allegiance and the national anthem.

A raised arm gesture appeared in the 1899 American stage production of Ben-Hur and its 1907 film adaptation. The gesture also appeared in several early Italian films, including the 1914 silent film Cabiria, the screenplay of which featured contributions from ultranationalist and Italian fascism influencer Gabriele D'Annunzio. D'Annunzio adopted the salute during his occupation of Fiume (1919–1920) and the Italian National Fascist Party began imposing it in the early 1920s.

The Ku Klux Klan's salute, reportedly dating to 1915, is similar but performed with the left arm and often with the fingers splayed, representing the four Ks in "Knights of the Ku Klux Klan".

By late 1923, some Nazi Party members were using the salute to greet Hitler, who responded by raising his own right hand crooked back at the elbow, palm opened upwards, in a gesture of acceptance. In 1926, the Nazi salute was made compulsory for all party members. It functioned as a display of commitment to the party and a declaration of principle to the outside world. Gregor Strasser wrote in 1927 that the greeting in and of itself was a pledge of loyalty to Hitler, as well as a symbol of personal dependence on the Führer. Even so, the drive to gain acceptance did not go unchallenged.

Some party members questioned the legitimacy of the so-called Roman salute, employed by Fascist Italy, as un-Germanic. In response, efforts were made to establish its pedigree by inventing a tradition after the fact. In June 1928, Rudolf Hess published an article titled "The Fascist Greeting", which claimed that the gesture was used in Germany as early as 1921, before the Nazis had heard about the Italian Fascists. He admits in the article: "The NSDAP's introduction of the raised-arm greeting approximately two years ago still gets some people's blood boiling. Its opponents suspect the greeting of being un-Germanic. They accuse it of merely aping the [Italian] Fascists", but goes on to ask, "even if the decree from two years ago [Hess' order that all party members use it] is seen as an adaption of the Fascist gesture, is that really so terrible?" Ian Kershaw points out that Hess did not deny the likely influence from Fascist Italy, even if indeed the salute had been used sporadically in 1921 as Hess claimed.

On the night of 3 January 1942, Hitler said of the origins of the salute:

I made it the salute of the Party long after the Duce had adopted it. I'd read the description of the sitting of the Diet of Worms, in the course of which Luther was greeted with the German salute. It was to show him that he was not being confronted with arms, but with peaceful intentions. In the days of Frederick the Great, people still saluted with their hats, with pompous gestures. In the Middle Ages the serfs humbly doffed their bonnets, whilst the noblemen gave the German salute. It was in the Ratskeller at Bremen, about the year 1921, that I first saw this style of salute. It must be regarded as a survival of an ancient custom, which originally signified: "See, I have no weapon in my hand!" I introduced the salute into the Party at our first meeting in Weimar. The SS at once gave it a soldierly style. It's from that moment that our opponents honored us with the epithet "dogs of Fascists".

— Adolf Hitler, Hitler's Table Talk

== Nazi chants ==
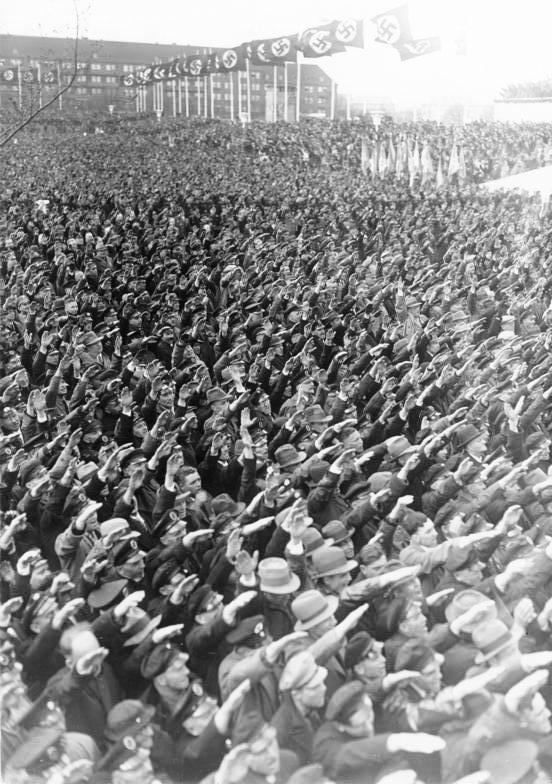
A mass "Sieg Heil" during a rally in the Tempelhof-Schöneberg district of Berlin in 1935

Nazi chants like "Heil Hitler!" and "Sieg Heil!" were prevalent across Nazi Germany, sprouting in mass rallies and even regular greetings alike.

In Nazi Germany, the Nazi chants "Heil Hitler!" and "Sieg Heil!" were the formulas used by the regime: when meeting someone it was customary to greet with the words "Heil Hitler!", while "Sieg Heil!" was a verbal salute used at mass rallies. Specifically to the cry of an officer of the word Sieg ('victory'), the crowd responded with Heil ('hail'). For example, at the 1934 Nuremberg Rally, Rudolf Hess ended his climactic speech with the words "The Party is Hitler. But Hitler is Germany, just as Germany is Hitler. Hitler! Sieg Heil!" At his total war speech delivered in 1943, audiences shouted "Sieg Heil!", as Joseph Goebbels solicited from them "a kind of plebiscitary 'Ja'" ('yes') to total war.

On 11 March 1945, less than two months before the capitulation of Nazi Germany, a memorial for the dead of the war was held in Marktschellenberg, a small town near Hitler's Berghof residence. The British historian Ian Kershaw remarks that the power of the Führer cult and the "Hitler Myth" had vanished, which is evident from this report:

When the leader of the Wehrmacht unit at the end of his speech called for a Sieg Heil for the Führer, it was returned neither by the Wehrmacht present, nor by the Volkssturm, nor by the spectators of the civilian population who had turned up. This silence of the masses [...] probably reflects better than anything else, the attitudes of the population.

The Swing Youth (German: Swingjugend) were a group of middle-class teenagers who consciously separated themselves from Nazism and its culture, greeting each other with "Swing-Heil!". This playful behaviour was dangerous for participants in the subculture; on 2 January 1942, police chief Heinrich Himmler suggested that the leaders be sent to concentration camps.

The form "Heil, mein Führer!" ('Hail, my Leader!') was used to directly address Hitler, while "Sieg Heil" was repeated as a chant on public occasions. Written communications would be concluded with either "mit deutschem Gruß" ('with German regards'), or with "Heil Hitler". In correspondence with high-ranking Nazi officials, letters were usually signed with "Heil Hitler".

== From 1933 to 1945 ==
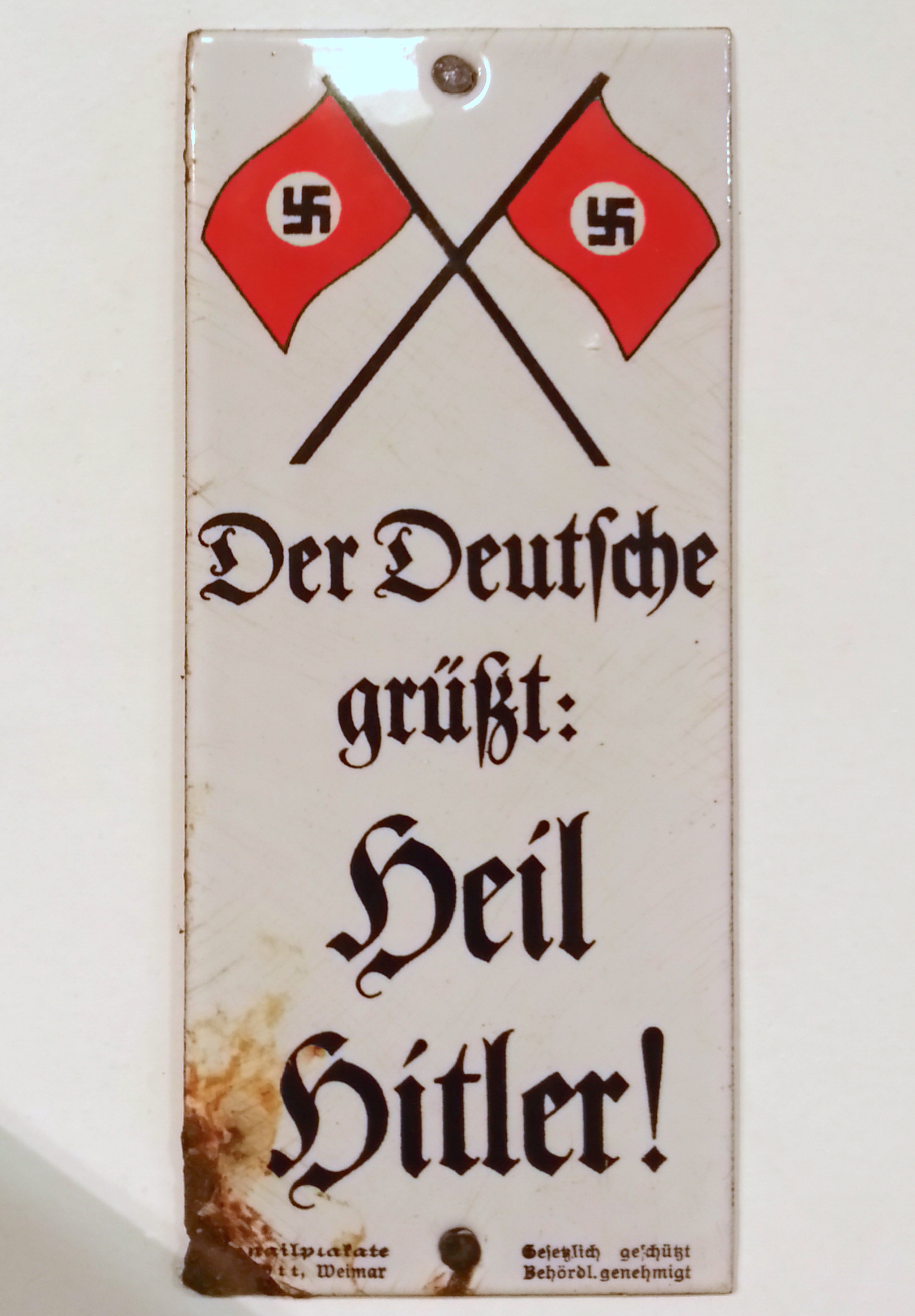
Enamel sign with the note "The German greets: Hail Hitler!" (Der Deutsche grüßt: Heil Hitler!)

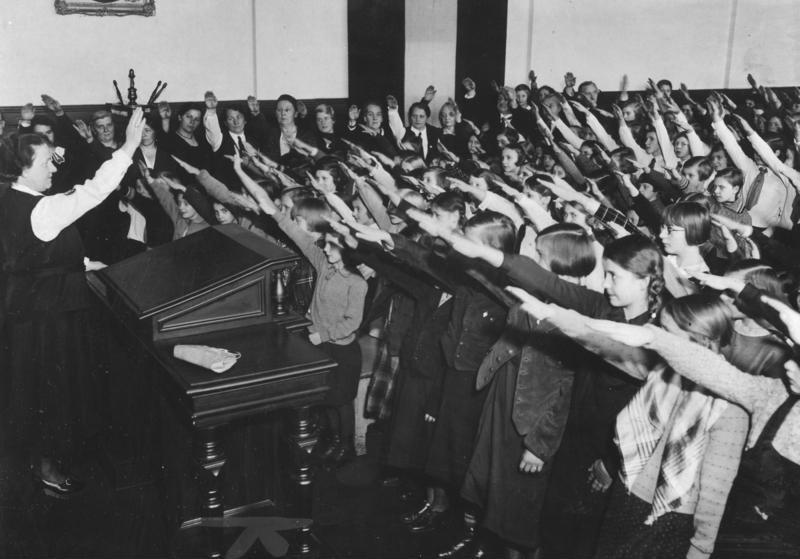
Ten- and eleven-year-old Berlin schoolchildren, 1934. The salute was a regular gesture in German schools.

Under a decree issued by Reich Minister of the Interior Wilhelm Frick on 13 July 1933 (one day before the ban on all non-Nazi parties), all German public employees were required to use the salute. The decree also required the salute during the singing of the national anthem and the "Horst-Wessel-Lied". It stipulated that "anyone not wishing to come under suspicion of behaving in a consciously negative fashion will therefore render the Hitler Greeting," and its use quickly spread as people attempted to avoid being labelled as a dissident. A rider to the decree, added two weeks later, stipulated that if physical disability prevented raising of the right arm, "then it is correct to carry out the Greeting with the left arm." On 27 September, prison inmates were forbidden to use the salute, as were Jews by 1937.

By the end of 1934, special courts were established to punish those who refused to salute. Offenders, such as Protestant preacher Paul Schneider, faced the possibility of being sent to a concentration camp. Jehovah's Witnesses came into conflict with the Nazi regime because they refused to salute Hitler, believing that it conflicted with their worship of God. Because such refusal was considered a crime, Jehovah's Witnesses were arrested and their children attending school were expelled, detained and separated from their families. Foreigners were not exempt from intimidation if they refused to salute. For example, the Portuguese Consul General was beaten by members of the Sturmabteilung for remaining seated in a car and not saluting a procession in Hamburg. Reactions to inappropriate use were not merely violent but sometimes bizarre. For example, a memo dated 23 July 1934 sent to local police stations stated: "There have been reports of traveling vaudeville performers training their monkeys to give the German Greeting. ... see to it that said animals are destroyed."

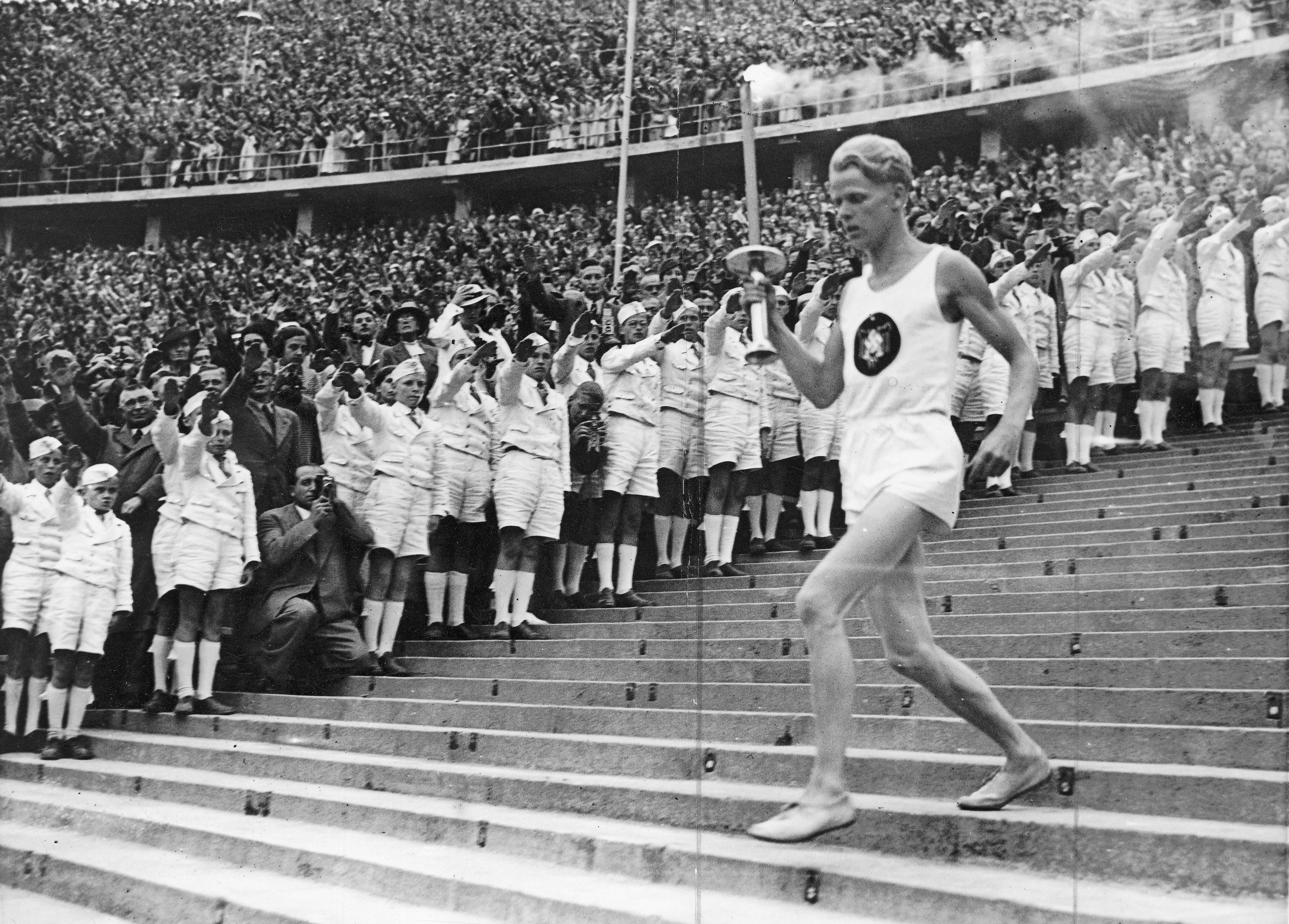
Fritz Schilgen carrying the Olympic torch at the Berlin Olympic Stadium as the public gives the Nazi salute (1936).

The salute soon became part of everyday life, a historically unique phenomenon that politicised all communication in Germany for twelve years, superseding all prior forms of greeting, such as "Grüß Gott" ("Hello"), "Guten Tag" ("Good day"), and "Auf Wiederseh(e)n" ("Goodbye"). Postmen used the greeting when they knocked on people's doors to deliver packages or letters. Small metal signs that reminded people to use the Hitler salute were displayed in public squares and on telephone poles and street lights throughout Germany. Department store clerks greeted customers with "Heil Hitler, how may I help you?" Dinner guests brought glasses etched with the words "Heil Hitler" as house gifts. The salute was required of all persons passing the Feldherrnhalle in Munich, site of the climax of the 1923 Beer Hall Putsch, which the government had made into a shrine to the Nazi dead; so many pedestrians avoided this mandate by detouring through the small Viscardigasse behind that the passage acquired the nickname "Dodgers' Alley" (Drückebergergasse). The daughter of the American Ambassador to Germany, Martha Dodd, describes the first time she saw the salute:

The first time I met von Ribbentrop was at a luncheon we gave at the Embassy. He was tall and slender, with a vague blond handsomeness. Outstanding among all the guests, Ribbentrop arrived in Nazi uniform. Most Nazis came to diplomatic functions in ordinary suits unless the affair was extremely formal. His manner of shaking hands was an elaborate ceremony in itself. He held out his hand, then retreated and held your hand at arm’s length, lowered his arm stiffly by his side, then raised the arm swiftly in a Nazi salute, just barely missing your nose. All the time he was staring at you with such intensity you were wondering what new sort of mesmerism he thought he was effecting. The whole ritual was performed with such self-conscious dignity and in such silence that hardly a word was whispered while Ribbentrop made his exhibitionistic acquaintance with the guests present. To me the procedure was so ridiculous I could scarcely keep a straight face.

Children were indoctrinated at an early age. Kindergarten children were taught to raise their hand to the proper height by hanging their lunch bags across the raised arm of their teacher. At the beginning of first grade primers was a lesson on how to use the greeting. The greeting found its way into fairy tales, including classics like Sleeping Beauty. Students and teachers would salute each other at the beginning and end of the school day, between classes, or whenever an adult entered the classroom.

In 1935, embryologist Hans Spemann gave a Nazi salute at the end of his Nobel Prize acceptance speech.

=== Sport ===
Some athletes used the Nazi salute in the opening ceremony of the 1936 Berlin Olympics as they passed by Hitler in the reviewing stand. This was done by delegates from Afghanistan, Bermuda, Bulgaria, Bolivia, France, Greece, Iceland, Italy and Turkey. The Bulgarian athletes performed the Nazi salute and broke into a goose step; Turkish athletes maintained the salute all around the track. There is some confusion over the use of the salute, since the stiff-arm Nazi salute could have been mistaken for an Olympic salute, with the right arm held out at a slight angle to the right from the shoulder. According to the American sports writer Jeremy Schaap, only half of the athletes from Austria performed a Nazi salute, while the other half gave an Olympic salute. According to the historian Richard Mandell, there are conflicting reports on whether athletes from France performed a Nazi salute or an Olympic Salute.

In football, the England football team bowed to pressure from the British Foreign Office and performed the salute during a friendly match on 14 May 1938. The following day Aston Villa's match against a German Select XI was played in marked contrast to the England game with continual jeering and whistling. When Alex Massie fouled Camillo Jerusalem, the referee needed to separate the teams. Hostility from the 110,000 crowd intensified when the Villa players left the pitch without the required Nazi salute and Joseph Goebbels was called to suppress subsequent hostile German press coverage.

=== Military use ===
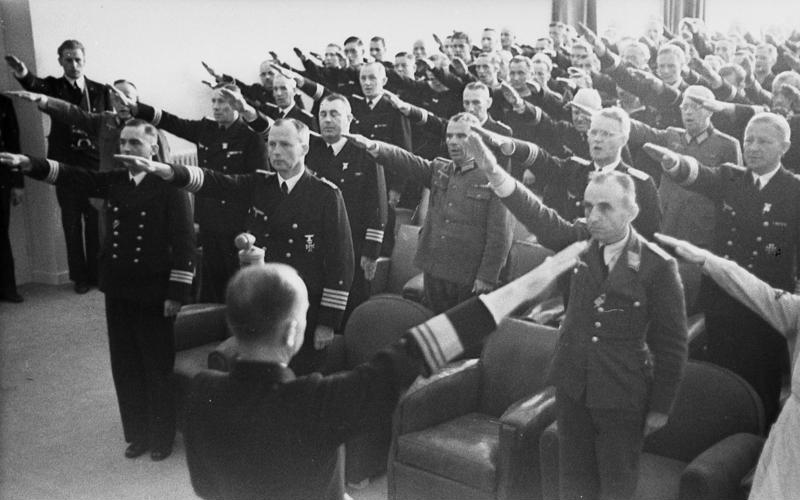
Karl Dönitz and Wehrmacht performing Nazi salute, 1941

The Wehrmacht refused to adopt the Hitler salute officially and was able for a time to maintain its customs. A compromise edict from the Reich Defense Ministry, issued on 19 September 1933, required the Hitler salute of soldiers and uniformed civil servants while singing the "Horst-Wessel-Lied" and national anthem, and in non-military encounters both within and outside the Wehrmacht (for example, when greeting members of the civilian government). At all other times they were permitted to use their traditional salutes. However, according to (pre-Nazi) Reichswehr and Wehrmacht protocol, the traditional military salute was prohibited when the saluting soldier was not wearing a uniform headgear (helmet or cap). Because of this, all bareheaded salutes used the Nazi salute, making it de facto mandatory in most situations. It was also mandatory for civilians.

Full adoption of the Hitler salute by the military was discussed in January 1944 at a conference regarding traditions in the military at Hitler's headquarters. Field Marshal Wilhelm Keitel, head of the Armed Forces, had expressed a desire to standardize the salute across all organizations in Germany. On 23 July 1944, several days after the failed assassination attempt, Goebbels suggested to Hitler that the military be ordered to fully adopt the Hitler salute as a show of loyalty, since Army officers had been responsible for the assassination attempt. Hitler approved the suggestion without emotion, and the order went into effect on 24 July 1944.

On the night of 3 January 1942, Hitler stated the following about the compromise edict of 1933:

I imposed the German salute for the following reason. I'd given orders, at the beginning, that in the Army I should not be greeted with the German salute. But many people forgot. Fritsch drew his conclusions, and punished all who forgot to give me the military salute, with fourteen days' confinement to barracks. I, in turn, drew my conclusions and introduced the German salute likewise into the Army.

— Adolf Hitler, Hitler's Table Talk

After Hitler's death, a group of Nazis saluted the dictator one last time after disposing of his remains just outside the Führerbunker emergency exit.

=== Satiric responses ===
Despite indoctrination and punishment, the salute was ridiculed by some people. Since heil is also the imperative of the German verb heilen ('to heal'), a common joke in Nazi Germany was to reply with, "Is he sick?" "Am I a doctor?" or "You heal him!" Jokes were also made by distorting the phrase. For example, "Heil Hitler" might become "Ein Liter" ('One liter') or "Drei Liter" ('Three liters'). Cabaret performer Karl Valentin would quip, "It's lucky that Hitler's name wasn't 'Kräuter'. Otherwise, we'd have to go around yelling Heilkräuter ('medicinal herbs')". Similar puns were made involving "-bronn" (rendering "Heilbronn", the name of a German city), and "-butt" (rendering "Heilbutt", the German word for 'halibut').

"Millions stand behind me" (John Heartfield photomontage)

Satirical use of the salute dates back to anti-Nazi propaganda in Germany before 1933. In 1932, photomontage artist John Heartfield used Hitler's modified version, with the hand bent over the shoulder, in a poster that linked Hitler to Big Business. A giant figure representing right-wing capitalists stands behind Hitler, placing money in his hand, suggesting "backhand" donations. The caption is, "the meaning of the Hitler salute" and "Millions stand behind me". Heartfield was forced to flee in 1933 after the Nazi seizure of power in Germany.

Another example is a cartoon by New Zealand political cartoonist David Low, mocking the Night of the Long Knives. Run in the Evening Standard on 3 July 1934, it shows Hitler with a smoking gun grimacing at terrified SA (Sturmabteilung) men with their hands up. The caption reads: "They salute with both hands now". When Achille Starace proposed that Italians should write Evviva Il Duce in letters, Mussolini wrote an editorial in Il Popolo d'Italia ridiculing the idea.

Particularly after the Battle of Berlin, some American soldiers performed the salute to mock Hitler, often also parodying his hair and moustache style.

== Post-1945 ==
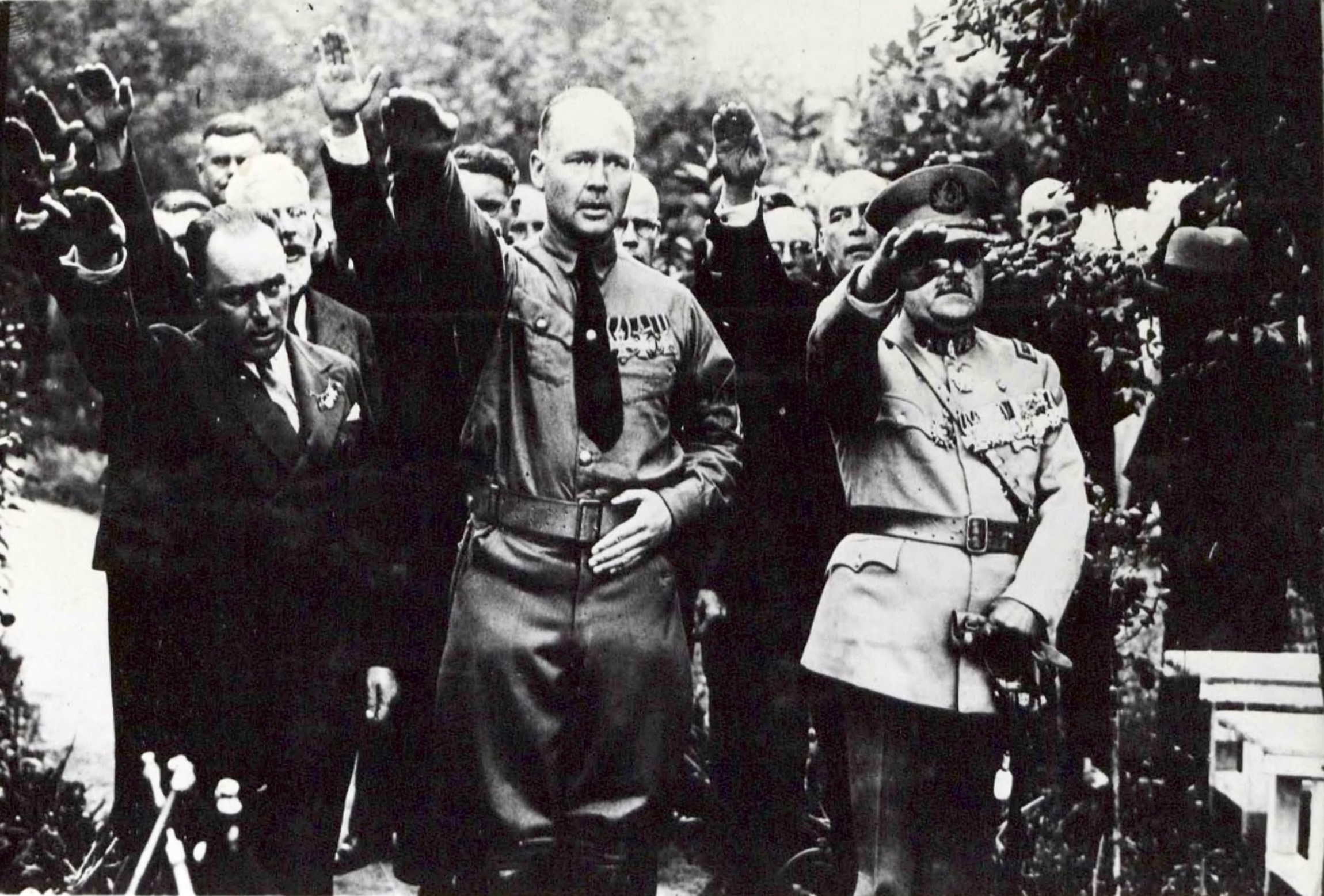
Two leaders give a Hitleresque salute amongst others in South America (from the official probe).

Today in Germany, Nazi salutes in written form, vocally, and even straight-extending the right arm as a saluting gesture (with or without the phrase), are illegal (under Strafgesetzbuch section 86a). The offence is punishable by up to three years in prison. Usage for art, teaching and science is allowed unless "the existence of an insult results from the form of the utterance or the circumstances under which it occurred". Use of the salute, or any phrases associated with the salute, has also been illegal in Austria since the end of World War II. It is also illegal in Slovakia. In Italy, it is a criminal offence only if used with the intent to "reinstate the defunct National Fascist Party", or to exalt or promote its ideology or members. It was used by Nazis in South America, as evidenced by an FBI-Chilean investigation and the claim of a man who was purportedly photographed with Hitler in 1954.

In Germany, usage that is "ironic and clearly critical of the Hitler Greeting" is exempt, which has led to legal debates as to what constitutes ironic use. One case involved Prince Ernst August of Hanover who was brought to court after using the gesture as a commentary on the behavior of an unduly zealous airport baggage inspector. On 23 November 2007, the Amtsgericht Cottbus sentenced Horst Mahler to six months of imprisonment without parole for having, according to his own claims, ironically performed the Hitler salute when reporting to prison for a nine-month term a year earlier. The following month, a pensioner was given a prison term of five months for, amongst other things, training his dog Adolf to raise his right paw in a Nazi salute every time the command "Heil Hitler!" was uttered.

In Canada and much of Europe (including the Czech Republic, France, the Netherlands, Sweden, Switzerland (as of 2014), the United Kingdom, Ukraine, and Russia), displaying the salute is not in itself a criminal offence, but constitutes hate speech if used to propagate Nazi ideology. In Australia, publicly performing the salute is illegal unless for a religious, academic, educational, artistic, literary, or scientific purpose.

Modified versions of the salute are sometimes used by neo-Nazis. One such version is the so-called "Kühnen salute" with extended thumb, index and middle finger, which is also a criminal offence in Germany. In written correspondence, the number 88 is sometimes used by some neo-Nazis as a substitute for "Heil Hitler" ("H" as the eighth letter of the alphabet). Swiss neo-Nazis were reported to use a variant of the Kühnengruss, though extending one's right arm over their head and extending said three fingers has a different historical source for Switzerland, as the first three Eidgenossen or confederates are often depicted with this motion. Hezbollah supporters in Lebanon often raise their arms in a Nazi-style salute.

The Afrikaner Weerstandsbeweging, a South African neo-Nazi organization known for its militant advocacy of white separatism, has espoused brown uniforms as well as Nazi German-esque flags, insignia, and salutes at meetings and public rallies. Hundreds of supporters in 2010 delivered straight-arm salutes outside the funeral for AWB leader Eugène Terre'Blanche, who was murdered by two black farm workers over an alleged wage dispute.

On 28 May 2012, BBC current affairs programme Panorama examined the issues of racism, antisemitism and football hooliganism, which it claimed were prevalent among Polish and Ukrainian football supporters. The two countries hosted the international football competition UEFA Euro 2012.

On 16 March 2013, Greek footballer Georgios Katidis of AEK Athens F.C. was handed a life ban from the Greek national team for performing the salute after scoring a goal against Veria F.C. in Athens' Olympic Stadium.

On 18 July 2015, The Sun published an image of the British Royal Family from private film shot in 1933 or 1934, showing Princess Elizabeth (the future Queen, then a young girl) and the Queen Mother both performing a Nazi salute, accompanied by Edward VIII, taken from 17 seconds of home footage (also released by The Sun). The footage ignited controversy in the UK, and there have been questions as to whether the release of this footage was appropriate. Buckingham Palace described the release of this footage as "disappointing", and considered pursuing legal action against The Sun, whereas Stig Abell (managing director of The Sun) said that the footage was "a matter of national historical significance to explore what was going on in the [1930s] ahead of the Second World War". Abell responded to criticism by assuring that The Sun was not suggesting "anything improper on the part of the Queen or indeed the Queen Mum".

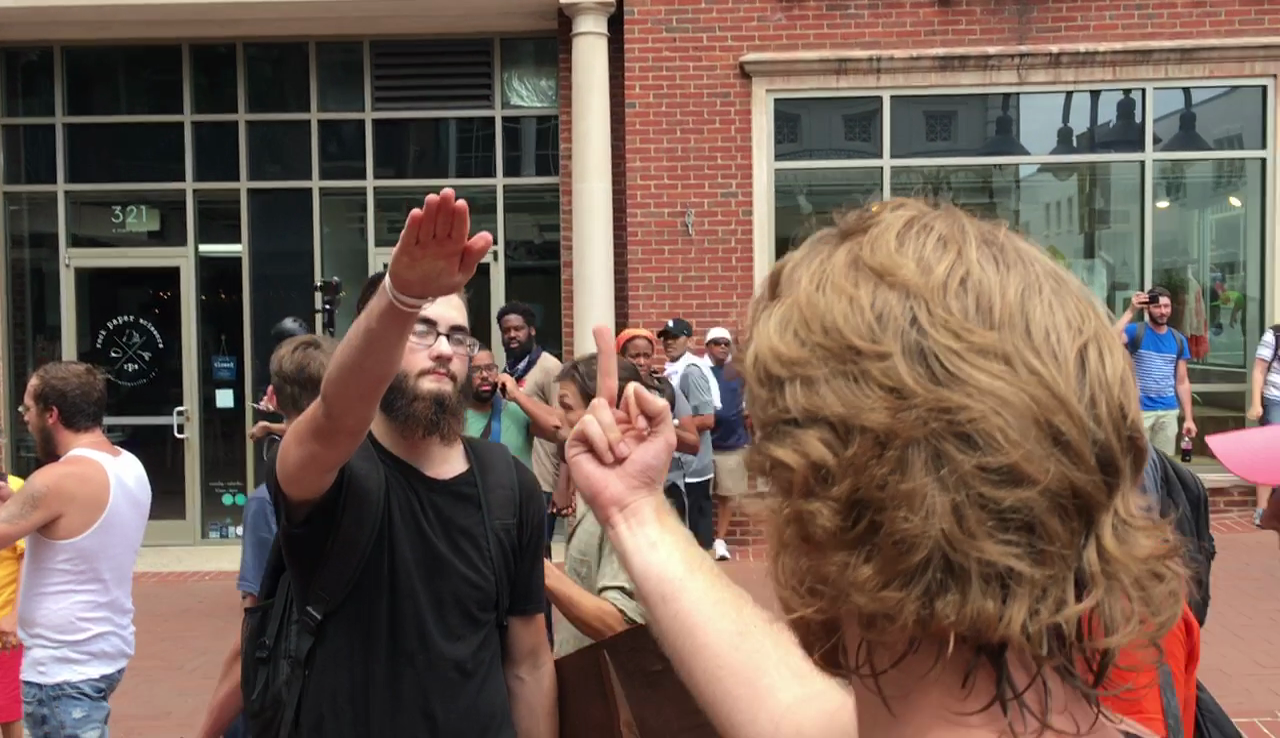
A far-right protestor's Nazi salute is met with the middle finger at the Unite the Right rally in Charlottesville (2017).

American white supremacist Richard B. Spencer drew considerable media attention in the weeks following the 2016 U.S. presidential election, where, at a National Policy Institute conference, he quoted from Nazi propaganda and denounced Jews. In response to his cry "Hail Trump, hail our people, hail victory!", a number of his supporters gave the Nazi salute and chanted in a similar fashion to the Sieg Heil chant.

CNN fired political commentator Jeffrey Lord on 10 August 2017, after he tweeted "Sieg Heil!" to Angelo Carusone, president of Media Matters for America, suggesting Carusone was a fascist.

In August 2021, a Michigan man, Paul Marcum, gave the Nazi salute during a dispute over mask mandates and was fired from his job as a tennis instructor after Birmingham Public Schools announced that it would not tolerate any acts of racism, disrespect, violence, or inequitable treatment of any person.

On 8 October 2024 in Australia, Jacob Hersant of the National Socialist Network became the first Victorian to be found guilty of performing a Nazi salute. On 4 February 2026, Hersant was sentenced to one month in jail.

=== Incidents involving North American students ===
On 31 January 2017, multiple students at Cypress Ranch High School in Cypress, Texas, performed both the raised fist salute and the Nazi salute in its "Class Of 2017" photo. The photo was then sent from one of the students to six other students by message and claiming that "some females held the fist while some white males raised the Nazi salute." The incident was reported to the Cypress-Fairbanks Independent School District saying that "they are extremely disappointed with the actions," and later made a statement on the district "understanding the serious nature of the incident and appropriate action has been taken at one of its campuses."

In May 2018, students at Baraboo High School, in Baraboo, Wisconsin, appeared to perform a Nazi salute in a photograph taken before their junior prom. The image went viral on social media six months later, sparking outrage. The school decided the students could not be punished because of their First Amendment rights.

In November 2018, a group of students of Pacifica High School of Garden Grove Unified School District in California was shown in a video giving the Nazi salute and singing Erika. The incident took place at an after-hours off-campus student athletics banquet. The school administration did not learn about the incident until March 2019, at which time the students were disciplined. The school did not release details of what the discipline entailed, but released a statement saying that they would continue to deal with the incident "in collaboration with agencies dedicated to anti-bias education." On 20 August 2019, the school district announced that it was reopening the investigation into the incident because new photographs and another video has surfaced of the event, along with "new allegations" and "new claims". Parents and teachers criticised the school's administration for their initial secrecy about the incident, for which the school's principal apologised.

In March 2019, students from Newport Beach, California, attending a private party made a swastika from red-and-white plastic party cups and gave Nazi salutes over it. Some of the students may have been from Newport Harbor High School of Newport-Mesa Unified School District, a very large district that encompasses 58 square miles and includes the cities of Newport Beach and Costa Mesa. Officials from the district condemned the students' behavior and said they were working with law enforcement to collect information on the incident.

On 1 February 2022, one of the pupils from Charles H. Best Middle School in North York, a district in Toronto, Ontario, Canada, performed a Nazi salute to a Jewish student while another who allegedly built a swastika, which led the Toronto District School Board to launch an investigation, and condemnation by the Simon Wiesenthal Center.

=== Russia ===
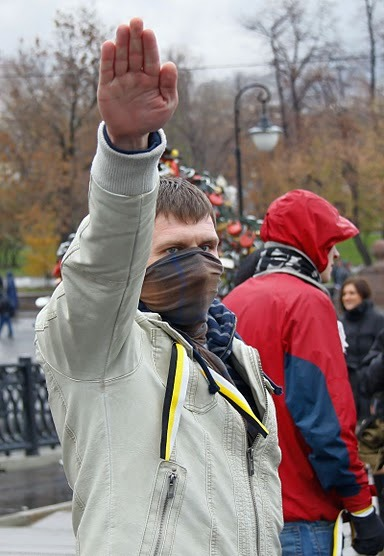
A Russian neo-Nazi does the Nazi salute during an anti-homosexual demonstration in Moscow in October 2010.

In 2012, the Financial Times reported that Nazi salutes have become common among neo-nationalists in Russia. Nazi salutes were made at nationalist protests in 2008 and 2010.

A "from the heart to the sun" form of the Nazi salute is used by neo-Nazis and neo-pagans in Russia. This salute has been used by members of the Rusich Group, a neo-Nazi paramilitary which has fought in Syria and Ukraine under the Wagner Group, including by its co-founder Alexey Milchakov, and Yan Petrovsky, a commander in the group. Alexei Petrov, a Russian government aide involved in the deportation of Ukrainian children to Russia, was found to have links to the neo-Nazi movement, and had posted a "from the heart to the sun" message on social media. The phrase "from the heart to the sun" can serve as a stand-in for actually performing the salute.

In April 2022, 15-year-old Russian karting champion Artem Severiukhin made an apparent Nazi salute on the podium after a race in Portugal, in which he tapped his chest before raising his right arm in a salute and beginning to laugh. His contract was subsequently terminated and he apologised for his action.

The Z military symbol used in the Russian invasion of Ukraine can also be referred to as ziga or Zieg, in reference to Sieg Heil. To make the Nazi salute can be referred to as zeeg in Russian, and zigging in English.

== See also ==
- Ave – Latin greeting, meaning "hail" or "be well"
- Elon Musk salute controversy
- "Heil Hitler" – 2025 single by Kanye West
- Heil og sæl – Icelandic greeting
- Obscene gesture
- Quenelle (gesture)
- Wolf salute – Turkish nationalist and Pan-Turkic hand symbol
- Zogist salute – Albanian nationalist salute
