= Mr. Blettsworthy on Rampole Island =

1928 novel by Herbert George Wells

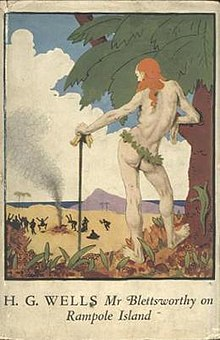
- First UK edition
- Author: H. G. Wells
- Original title: Mr. Blettsworthy on Rampole Island: Being the Story of a Gentleman of Culture and Refinement who suffered Shipwreck and saw no Human Beings other than Cruel and Savage Cannibals for several years. How he beheld Megatheria alive and made some notes of their Habits. How he became a Sacred Lunatic. How he did at last escape in a Strange Manner from the Horror and Barbarities of Rampole Island in time to fight in the Great War, and how afterwards he came near returning to that Island for ever. With much Amusing and Edifying Matter concerning Manners, Customs, Beliefs, Warfare, Crime, and a Storm at Sea. Concluding with some Reflections upon Life in General and upon these Present Times in Particular.
- Illustrator: George Picken
- Language: English
- Publisher: Ernest Benn (UK); Doubleday Doran (US)
- Publication date: 1928
- Publication place: United Kingdom
- Pages: 347

Mr. Blettsworthy on Rampole Island is a 1928 novel by H. G. Wells. The novel entered the public domain in the United States in 2024.

== Plot summary ==
The protagonist of the novel, Arnold Blettsworthy, is the scion of a genteel family prominent "in the south and west of England." Blettsworthy's father, however, was an adventurer who married a woman from Madeira. Both his mother and his father die early, and the young Blettsworthy is raised in Cheltenham by an aunt and an uncle who is a liberal Anglican priest. A complacent Edwardian worldview that an Oxford education did nothing to shake is undermined when Blettsworthy is betrayed in business and in love by his best friend, Graves, and his mistress, Olive Slaughter. A family solicitor and counselor named Ferndyke advises him to travel in order to recover from disillusionment so severe that it has threatened his sanity. Arnold Blettsworthy follows his advice and embarks for Pernambuco and Rio de Janeiro on a tramp steamer, the Golden Lion. But the captain and crew take a disliking to him, and when the vessel founders off the coast of Brazil there is a mutiny that results in the captain shutting Blettsworthy in a cabin and leaving him to perish with the ship.

Blettsworthy survives only by being captured by cannibals who take him to Rampole Island. There he becomes the "sacred lunatic" of a tribe living in Neolithic conditions on an island where megatheria are still subsisting. The most forward-thinking of the sages who govern the tribe, Chit, makes strategic use of Blettsworthy and his advanced ideas, but when he falls in love with a woman coveted by the tribe's military chief Ardam, he becomes an outcast. He seems about to die in the struggle that results, but awakens to find that he has really been in New York City in the care of Rowena (cf. Wena) and Dr. Minchett (cf. Chit), a psychoanalyst. He learns that he has lived through an extended hallucinatory psychotic episode. World War I has broken out in the meantime, and having recovered his sanity, Blettsworthy believes that the best thing for him to do is to enlist in the British Army as a private. He survives being wounded in combat, but loses a leg. While recovering he meets Graves again, whom he forgives and helps become a success in "the world of post-war marketing." At the end of the novel, Blettsworthy, "barely forty," is encouraged by Graves to devote the rest of his life to "the general advance of mankind."

== Composition and reception ==
Like The Autocracy of Mr. Parham and The Bulpington of Blup, Mr. Blettsworthy on Rampole Island did not sell as well as Wells's earlier novels; these are now among his "least read books", according to biographer David Smith. In the aftermath of the publication of Mr. Blettsworthy on Rampole Island, publishers began to haggle with Wells over advances and the value of serial rights for his novels. Wells's friends, however, continued to praise his work; Eileen Power, for example, called the novel "absolutely first class".

Brian Ash described the novel as an early example (the first he mentions) of psychological science fiction that was a precursor of the "inner space" genre.
