= The Bulpington of Blup =

1932 novel by H. G. Wells

- First edition
- Author: H. G. Wells
- Original title: The Bulpington of Blup: Adventures, Poses, Stresses, Conflicts, and Disaster in a Contemporary Brain
- Illustrator: George Picken
- Language: English
- Publisher: Hutchinson & Co.
- Publication date: 1932
- Publication place: United Kingdom
- Pages: 414

The Bulpington of Blup is a 1932 novel by H. G. Wells. It is a character study analyzing the psychological sources of resistance to Wellsian ideology, and was influenced by Wells's acquaintance with Carl Gustav Jung and his ideas.

The inner life of the protagonist, Theodore Bulpington, is dominated by a complex he calls "The Bulpington of Blup." This self-regarding, romantic, heroic personality comes over time to dominate his existence, falsifying his relations with the world. Theodore Bulpington develops into a pretentious fraud who finally affirms a modus vivendi of falsehood: "I am a lie. I accept it. I am a liar in a world of lies." The novel is also of interest for its extended analysis of psychological responses to World War I.

The life of Ford Madox Ford inspired some aspects of the novel. The Bulpington of Blup is dedicated to Odette Keun, Wells's lover from 1924 to 1933.

Like Mr. Blettsworthy on Rampole Island and The Autocracy of Mr. Parham, The Bulpington of Blup did not sell as well as Wells's earlier novels; these are now among his "least read books," according to biographer David Smith. Wells believed that the novel was as good as Kipps, but critics have not shared this view.

== Censorship ==
The Bulpington of Blup contains several sexual scenes, and also contains passages critical of the Roman Catholic Church. For these reasons, the book was banned in both the Irish Free State and Francoist Spain.
