= Rusich Group =

Russian neo-Nazi paramilitary unit

Sabotage Assault Reconnaissance Group "Rusich"
- Диверсионно-штурмовая разведывательная группа «Русич»
- Patch of the Rusich Group featuring the kolovrat, a Slavic Pagan variant of the swastika
- Active: June 2014 – present
- Country: Russia
- Branch: Volunteer Corps AF RF, FSB Border Service of Russia
- Type: Infantry
- Role: Sabotage and assault reconnaissance group
- Size: A few hundred people
- Part of: / Army of the South-East/Batman Battalion (2014); Wagner Group
- Colours: White, gold, black
- Engagements: Russo-Ukrainian war; War in Donbas; Russian invasion of Ukraine; Russian military intervention in the Syrian civil war; Wagner Group rebellion
- Website: vk.com/dshrg_rusich

Commanders
- Current commander: Alexey Milchakov
- Notable commanders: Alexey Milchakov; Yan Petrovsky

Insignia
- Flag

- Flag (2014)

The Sabotage Assault Reconnaissance Group (DShRG) "Rusich" (Note: Russian: Диверсионно-штурмовая разведывательная группа «Русич», romanized: Diversionno-shturmovaya razvedyvatel'naya gruppa «Rusich») is a Russian far-right and neo-Nazi paramilitary unit that has been fighting against Ukrainian forces in the Russo-Ukrainian War. Its co-founder and leader is Alexey Milchakov and operates within the Wagner Group. "Rusich" fought on the side of pro-Russian military in the Donbas war from June 2014 to July 2015, and in the Russian invasion of Ukraine alongside Russian troops.

== History ==
The foundations of the Rusich group were laid in 2009, when a military training base was founded by Alexey Milchakov, a neo-Nazi from Saint Petersburg. He had the nickname "Fritz" before being sent to the Donbas (there he changed to the call sign "Serb"). He took part in the Partizan paramilitary training program at the Novorossiya Aid Coordination Center (KCPN) run by the Russian Imperial Legion, a paramilitary arm of the Russian Imperial Movement. Both Milchakov and the nominal commander of the Wagner group Dmitry Utkin served in the 76th Guards Air Assault Division of the Airborne Forces.

According to Milchakov, "Rusich" consists of "nationalist Rodnovers, volunteers from Russia and Europe", operates as a "closed collective" and is a unit in which Russian nationalists receive combat training. The units turned out to be staffed by members of the GROM special unit, which is part of the Federal Drug Control Service. The brothers Konstantin and Boris Voevodin, for example, are Russian nationalists from Saint Petersburg.

=== Donbas war ===
The group has been fighting on the side of pro-Russian separatists in the Donbas war since June 2014, conducting reconnaissance and sabotage operations behind Ukrainian lines, and also played a significant role in several key battles at the beginning of the war.

==== 2014 ====
In the summer of 2014, "Rusich" fought as part of the Batman Rapid Response Group under the Russian separatist commander Lieutenant Colonel Alexander "Batman" Bednov and participated in the battles for the Luhansk Airport, near Novosvitlivka after the Armed Forces of Ukraine had cut the highway there, and placed Luhansk under blockade. They also took part in the battles near the city of Shchastia, Stanytsia Luhanska, in the assault on the village of Khryashchuvate, in the occupation of the villages of Heorhiivka, Velyka Verhunka, Lutuhyne.

One of the most well known operations of "Rusich" was the ambush of a column of the Ukrainian Aidar Battalion near the villages of Metalist and Tsvitni Pisky in the Luhansk Oblast on 5 September 2014, after a truce was supposed to have gone into effect. Andriy Khvedchak, coordinator of the Volyn Maidan Self-Defense, said that on 5 September 2014, a part of the company of the Aidar battalion was ambushed in the same place where Nadiya Savchenko was taken prisoner. Detachments of "Rusich" and RRT "Batman" set up an ambush on the highway and attacked the retreating "Aidar". Part of the second company of "Aydar" (Volyn) was ambushed by Russian special forces. According to him, the ambushed fighters were killed. On 6 September, Semen Semenchenko reported that 11 soldiers were killed in an ambush "arranged by Russian special forces". On the same day, information appeared that from 20 to 29 fighters of the battalion were killed in an ambush.

Rusich published a video of an interrogation of Ivan Issyk, a member of the Aidar Battalion captured during the ambush. In the video, Issyk had a kolovrat, a neo-Nazi symbol used by the Rusich Group, carved into his cheek. Five days later, Issyk, who by now had over 70% of his body covered in burns, was interviewed by the British pro-Russian propagandist Graham Phillips in a hospital. Issyk's parents accused Phillips of violating journalist ethics. Several days later Issyk was abducted from the hospital and murdered. An autopsy showed that his internal organs were cut out and shuffled in his body, including fragments of his brain being put in his stomach.

In the fall of 2014, Rusich took part in the battles at the Donetsk International Airport along with the Sparta and Somali battalions.

==== 2015 ====
The most famous losses are the death of Alexander Bednov's personal guards in an ambush on January 1, 2015. A lesser-known story is about DShRG getting into the counter-base, during which the former Kyiv anti-fascist "Whiskas" died. In January 2015, Milchakov announced that his unit was no longer subordinate to the leadership of the Luhansk People's Republic. Thus, Milchakov reacted to the information about the killing of the former commander of the Batman group, Alexander Bednov. The commander called the Head of the Luhansk People's Republic Igor Plotnitsky and the government of the LPR "whore children" and said that his unit would fight "against them and against the Ukrainians".

In February 2015 Milchakov was included in the EU sanctions list.

In 2015, together with the commanders of other groups, Milchakov and Petrovsky received a certificate of membership of the Union of Donbass Volunteers. Upon returning to Ukraine, the group was transferred to the Prizrak Brigade of Aleksey Mozgovoy. At the end of March 2015, after being redeployed to the Donetsk People's Republic due to persecution by the Ministry of State Security of the LPR, the group became part of the Viking battalion, where it took part in the battles around Volnovakha, near the villages of Belokamenki and Novolaspa. In mid-2015, the group was completely withdrawn from the Donbass.

=== From 2015 to 2022 ===
Upon his return from the Donbass, Milchakov engaged in combat training of teenagers in special camps in Russia. This was done in conjunction with right-wing radicals from the E.N.O.T. Corp. private military company. The online edition "Belarusian Partizan" calls the "raccoons" a group of Russian militants who took part in the war in Donbass from its very beginning, and that they are close friends with Milchakov. As the publication notes, since 2015, raccoon began its legalization in Russia. They received the status of a public organization and the full support of the state, regularly holding military-patriotic games-gatherings. The chief instructor of the organization, Roman Telenkevich, simultaneously headed the Union of Donbass Volunteers.

According to the Jamestown Foundation, after fighting briefly in Ukraine, Milchakov and other associates carried out cryptocurrency crime and drug dealing to fund their operation.

In 2016, Milchakov, as a member of the "Union of Volunteers of Donbass", may have been presented with an award by the head of the Republic of Crimea Sergey Aksyonov in the presence of the then assistant to the President of the Russian Federation Vladislav Surkov. Milchakov himself, however, was not shy in terms, criticizing the leadership of the LPR for this ostentatious "anti-fascism" on his VK page.

Milchakov's deputy, Jan Petrovsky, is a former resident of Norway, where he lived and worked with the neo-Nazi groups Soldiers of Odin and Nordic Resistance Movement. The peculiar glory of the Russian in the conflict in Donbass, apparently, was the last straw for the Norwegian authorities, and he was finally recognized as a threat to national security. In October 2016, Norwegian police arrested Petrovsky and deported him to Russia.

The group was one of the most mentioned in the negative connotation among the Ukrainian media and bloggers because of the photos of the killed soldiers of Ukraine and the stories that the group does not take prisoners. In 2017, the military prosecutor's office of Ukraine accused Milchakov of involvement in the murder of 40 Ukrainian soldiers.

In 2017, Rusich militants showed up in Syria guarding the strategically important oil and gas infrastructure owned by Russian companies. On their (now inaccessible) Instagram account, the militants posted photos from Palmyra in central Syria, where one of them poses in front of ancient ruins, raising his hand in a Nazi salute. An investigation by Bellingcat analyzed a 2017 photograph depicting a man in military uniform holding a severed human head near Palmyra. The investigation concluded the uniform was likely worn by Alexey Milchakov. Bellingcat found that on 17 October 2017, Rusich member Nikitin Alexander Vladimirovich (AKA "The Livonian") was killed in Syria.

At the end of 2020, Alexey Milchakov said in an interview that the number of Rusich DShRG at that time was several dozen people, but "a lot of people come and they have to be weeded out".

=== Russian invasion of Ukraine ===
External videos
- Captured Ukrainian soldier was beheaded by Russian war criminals from DShRG «Rusich»

The group returned to Ukraine at the beginning of April 2022, as the Russian invasion was underway. Rusich's fighters were transferred to the Kharkiv Oblast of Ukraine, where they were photographed near the village of Pletenivka. In 2022, the detachment and its commanders Alexey Milchakov and Yan Petrovsky were included in the US sanctions list for their "special cruelty" in the battles in the Kharkiv Oblast. Rusich is affiliated with a coalition of neo-Nazi military groups taking part in the Russian invasion of Ukraine made up of Russian Imperial Movement, AWD Russland and Russian ONA, with some overlap.

In April 2023, the Rusich Group posted a video on their Telegram channel showing a captured Ukrainian soldier being beheaded with a knife, together with a caption stating that many more are to come.

In May 2023 Rusich posted on their Telegram channel how they had used drones to drop the banned poison gas chloropicrin on Ukrainian positions.

In August 2023 Yan Petrovsky was detained in Finland and Ukraine requested his extradition. The Rusich Group issued an ultimatum to the Russian government that they will not participate in any combat in Ukraine until Russia secured the release of Petrovsky. The group had been fighting on the Robotyne-Verbove line, defending the sector from the 2023 Ukrainian counteroffensive, with their absence likely exacerbating Russian tactical losses in the region.

In August 2024 Rusich posted on its Telegram channel a video of a severed head of a Ukrainian soldier mounted on a spike. Ukrainska Pravda claimed that a Russian soldier "was ordered to cut off the heads of four dead Ukrainian soldiers". On August 19, 2024 Rusich asked for a Ukrainian prisoner to be surrendered to them for a human sacrifice for "autumnal equinox to encourage and strengthen the spirit of the new personnel of the unit". Rusich is affiliated with neo-pagan groups and the satanist Order of Nine Angles that practices human sacrifice and its affiliated groups like the Atomwaffen Division. Later it emerged that Rusich members had sacrificed a Chechen Akhmat fighter in a ritual and recorded themselves mutilating him.

Rusich Group stated in September 2024 that it has entered an official agreement with Border Service under the FSB to strengthen the border and conduct intelligence activities on the Finnish border in the northwestern district of Karelia and posted pictures of their soldiers at Rättijärvi. The newspaper Contando Estrelas pointed out that "last year, the Russian newspaper Izvestia linked the ONA to murders committed in the Karelia region", location of the Russian central nexion, and now the region where Rusich is deployed.

In November 2025 Rusich organized a competition for its members, promising cryptocurrency rewards for submitted photos of Ukrainian prisoners of war being executed, featuring them on their Telegram channel. They featured a picture of a Rusich militant posing with three executed Ukrainian prisoners to announce the competition.

In December 2025, Rusich members voiced their support for the perpetrator of the 2025 Odintsovo school attack who stabbed several children, killing a 10-year-old Tajik boy.

== Ideology and symbols ==
Rusich emblem featuring a combination of the Kolovrat swastika, the Black Sun, the Algiz rune, the Týr rune, the ribbon of Saint George and the black-yellow-white flag of the Russian Empire.

Tsar Alexander II's Flag of the Russian Empire (1858–1896)

"Rusich" is described as a far-right extremist and neo-Nazi unit. According to Petrovsky, Rusich is "a Pan-Slavic, Pan-Scandinavian group."

The following are used as symbols of the group: runes, in particular Tiwaz (ᛏ) (meaning the god of military prowess Týr), the eight-rayed Kolovrat, Valknut, and code slogans. Like many Russian nationalists, they also use the Russian imperial flag (black-yellow-white tricolor), but reversed so that white is on top.

Milchakov became an influential figure among the neo-fascist youth in Russia. He is also one of the few who were not affected by arrests upon his return to Russia. According to Milchakov himself, his group does not even try to get into politics, no matter how insulting it is for decisions from above.

In post on their Telegram channel on how to "solve the Ukrainian question," they propose forcing Ukrainian women to serve as wives of Russian soldiers without any civil or human rights. In particular, they call for soldiers to be "given 2-3 girls each" aged 10 or below as sexual slaves "to solve the demographic question in Russia." Further, they claim that "rape is not a crime" and "Ukrainian women dream about being raped by Russian soldiers".

According to religious studies scholars Kaarina Aitamurto and Ross Downing, Rusich members are anti-Christian and view it as a cunning Jewish plot to enslave Russians. Christians are seen as egalitarian, passive and weak. Some members "align with satanism for the reason that Satan is the one who is fighting against the Jewish God".

=== Foreign volunteers ===
Rusich has neo-Nazi volunteers from around Europe fighting in its ranks. Polish neo-Nazis from "Zadrużny Krąg - Slavic Division" led by former police officer Arwid Pływaczewski have joined Rusich. At least one of the members of the Polish neo-Nazi group "Zadruga" fought as part of this unit. Further, members of Rusich have previously been associated with the Nordic Resistance Movement in Fennoscandia, where Petrovsky has also sought to recruit people from. Petrovsky has a close relationship with the Finnish far-right and is reportedly connected to the ONA. Finnish volunteer group Karhu (Bear) joined and fought with Rusich when they were subordinate to Prizrak. Pływaczewski was arrested in Poland in May 2026, allegedly having been sent to perform espionage and sabotage on NATO troops with two other Poles. According to Polish media, Rusich is mainly Russian but "several dozen" Polish and Finnish neo-Nazis fight in its ranks. Finnish-Russian pro-Russian propagandist Kosti Heiskanen, associated with the North Slavic Community and the Volunteer Special Training Center affiliated the Rusich Group, organized a delegation of Finns, including leader of the Ultranationalist Finnish People First-party Marco de Wit that visited Donbass and the Finnish volunteers there. The group included Johan Bäckman and Janus Putkonen known for recruiting Finnish volunteers.

== See also ==
- Atomwaffen Division Russland, another Russian neo-Nazi military group trained by Russian Imperial Movement
- Azov Regiment
- Wagner Group
- Patriot (PMC)
- Redut (PMC)
