= List of David Low's Cartoons in Australian Newspapers =

List of cartoons

The list provides links to Low cartoons which appeared in Australian newspapers.

David Low Cartoons in Australian newspapers & magazines
Date	Caption	Published in
1919-02-06	THE ARREST.	The Bulletin
1919-05-01	“COULD YOU OBLIGE ME WITH A MATCH?”	The Bulletin
1919-05-01	HORATIUS HOLDS THE BRIDGE.	The Bulletin
1919-05-08	AND THE TREE GOES ON STANDING.	The Bulletin
1919-05-15	“PEACE, PERFECT PEACE.” “Signor Orlando has returned to Paris, and the Big Four are in harmony again.”	The Bulletin
1920-01-17	NO ROOM.	Daily News
1920-05-01	THE CROPS ARE RISING. The Small Three: "Here, we thought it was to sprout olive branches."	The World's News
1920-05-06	LLOYD GEORGE: "WELL THAT'S ONE OF THEM FIXED."	Catholic Press
1927-12-29	A STRANGER ASKS THE ORACLES THE WAY TO CIVILIZATION	Evening Standard
1929-07-01	"JIX," AS DAVID LOW SEES HIM	The Daily Telegraph
1933-12-21	LOW'S IDEA OF AN IRISH ELECTION	The Courier-Mail
1934-05-16	LOW ON THE AERIAL ARMAMENTS RACE	The Courier-Mail
1934-05-24	A PATRIOTIC APPEAL	The Courier-Mail
1934-06-05	LOW ON 'ELLIOTRY' AND DOMINION IMPORTS	The Courier-Mail
1934-12-12	LOW, ON THE NAVAL CONFERENCE PROBLEM	The Courier-Mail
1935-02-16	LOW'S TOPICAL BUDGET	Westralian Worker
1935-05-12	LYON'S CORNER HOUSE	The Sun
1939-09-01	LOW'S PROPHETIC CARTOON	Westralian Worker
1940-08-17	"I GAVE YOU A NICE PLACARD IN EXCHANGE, DIDN'T I ?"	The Daily Telegraph
1940-12-12	"I APPEAL TO COMMON SENSE!"	Daily News
1940-12-14	IRISH ARGUMENT	Daily News
1940-12-18	THE FRUSTRATION OF PITY	Daily News
1940-12-26	" — AND THEN THERE WERE FOUR "	Daily News
1940-12-31	HIGH STRATEGY	Daily News
1941-01-10	"HELP! HERE'S ONE SHOWING FIGHT !"	Daily News
1941-05-16	NET SPREAD IN SIGHT OF THE BIRD	Daily News
1941-08-15	AS LOW SEES THEM	Daily News
1947-11-08	"OH LOR! THE SKIPPER'S HAVING ANOTHER OF HIS SPELLS"	Daily News
1952-11-05	"BILLY"	The Bulletin
