= David Low (cartoonist) =

New Zealand-born cartoonist (1891–1963)

Sir David Low
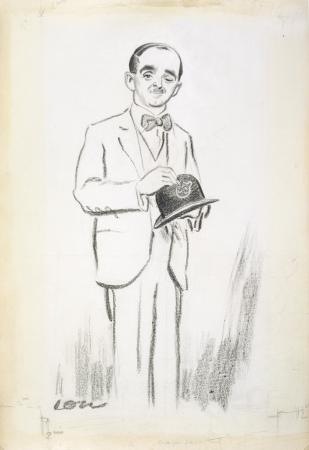
- Self-portrait
- Born: 7 April 1891; Dunedin, New Zealand
- Died: 19 September 1963 (aged 72); London, England
- Occupations: Political cartoonist and caricaturist

Sir David Alexander Cecil Low (7 April 1891 – 19 September 1963) was a New Zealand political cartoonist and caricaturist who lived and worked in the United Kingdom for many years. Low was a self-taught cartoonist. Born in New Zealand, he worked in his native country before migrating to Sydney in 1911, and ultimately to London (1919), where he made his career and earned fame for his Colonel Blimp depictions and his satirising of the personalities and policies of German dictator Adolf Hitler, Italian dictator Benito Mussolini, Soviet leader Joseph Stalin, and other leaders of his times.

Low was born and educated in New Zealand. His first work was published when he was only 11 years old. His professional career began at The Canterbury Times in 1910. The following year he moved to Australia and worked for The Bulletin. His work attracted the attention of Henry Cadbury, the part owner of The Star, and Low moved to London in 1919, working for that paper until 1927, when he moved to the Evening Standard. There he produced his most famous work, chronicling the rise of fascism in the 1930s, the policy of appeasement, and the conflict of World War II. His provocative depictions of Hitler and Mussolini led to his work being banned in Italy and Germany, and him being named in The Black Book, a list of people the Nazis had planned to arrest.

== Biography ==
=== Early life ===
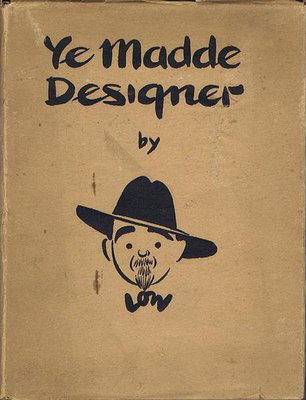
Ye Madde Designer, 1935

The son of chemist David Brown Low and Jane Caroline Flanagan, David Low was born in Dunedin, New Zealand, on 7 April 1891, and attended primary school there. His family later moved to Christchurch, where Low briefly attended Christchurch Boys' High School. However, following the death of his eldest brother, Low was taken out of school, as his parents believed that he had been weakened by over studying. Low's first cartoon was published in 1902, when he was 11 years old, a three-picture strip in the British comic Big Budget.

=== Early career ===
Low began his career in 1910 as a cartoonist with the Canterbury Times, a newspaper in Christchurch, New Zealand. In 1911, he moved to Sydney, Australia, to join The Bulletin. A large-format collection of some 350 pieces for those papers was published in the album Caricatures by Low 1915. During his employment at The Bulletin, Low became well known for a 1916 cartoon satirising Billy Hughes, then the Prime Minister of Australia, entitled The Imperial Conference. After that success, Low published many cartoons depicting Hughes' forceful and eccentric personality. Hughes was not impressed and apparently called Low a "bastard" to his face. A collection of Low's cartoons of Hughes entitled The Billy Book, which he published in 1918, brought Low to the notice of Henry Cadbury, part-owner of The Star. In 1919, Cadbury offered Low a job with the Star, which Low promptly accepted.

=== Move to England ===
From 1919 to 1927, Low worked at the London Star, which sympathised with his moderately left-wing views. In 1927, he accepted an invitation from Max Aitken to join the conservative Evening Standard on the strict understanding that there would be no editorial interference with his output. In 1928, Low showed his support for newly enfranchised women with his character "Joan Bull". The character appeared for a few years but fell out of regular use as the public concerns about women getting the vote disappeared. Low produced numerous cartoons about the Austrian Civil War, the Italian invasion of Ethiopia, the 1936 Summer Olympics, the Spanish Civil War, and other events of the interwar period. He also worked with Horace Thorogood to produce illustrated whimsical articles on the London scene, under the byline "Low & Terry".

John Gunther called Low "the greatest caricaturist in the world". In 1937, Nazi Propaganda Minister Joseph Goebbels told British Foreign Secretary Lord Halifax that British political cartoons, particularly those of Low's, were damaging Anglo-German relations. In 1937, Low had produced an occasional strip about "Hit and Muss" (Hitler and Mussolini), but after Germany made official complaints he substituted a composite dictator, "Muzzler". After the war, Low's name was found in The Black Book, the list of those the Nazis planned to arrest in the aftermath of an invasion of Great Britain. Low quipped in response to the finding, "That is all right. I had them on my list too."

=== Second World War ===
Rendezvous by David Low depicting Adolf Hitler and Joseph Stalin bowing politely across the dead body of Poland, smiling and doffing their caps to each other. "The scum of the earth, I believe?" Hitler says. "The bloody assassin of the workers, I presume?" Stalin replies, 20 September 1939.

His works are featured in many British history textbooks. On 1 September, the Germans invaded Poland from the west and, on 17 September, the Soviets invaded from the east. Low depicted these events in one of his most famous cartoons, Rendezvous, first published in the Evening Standard on 20 September 1939. It satirises the cynicism at the heart of the Molotov–Ribbentrop Pact, showing Hitler and Soviet dictator Joseph Stalin bowing politely across the dead body of Poland and greeting each other respectively as "The scum of the earth, I believe?" and "The bloody assassin of the workers, I presume?" The phrasing is based on that supposedly used by Henry Morton Stanley at his meeting with David Livingstone in 1871, and the dictators are shown raising their hats to one another in greeting similarly to the two explorers in artistic reconstructions of that earlier meeting. The work has been parodied by several other cartoonists.

The Harmony Boys of 2 May 1940 depicts Hitler, Stalin, Italian dictator Benito Mussolini, and Spanish dictator Francisco Franco "harmonizing" and getting along quite well. When this cartoon was published, the German invasion of the Soviet Union was still more than a year in the future.

His satirical works met much criticism in the British public eye. The British press called him a "war monger", and many citizens felt disdain for his depictions of appeasement.

=== Remainder of career ===
Low remained in the United Kingdom for the rest of his career. He left the Evening Standard in 1950. That same year, he moved to the Daily Herald and stayed there until 1953. Finally, Low moved to the Manchester Guardian and was there from 1953.

Low received a knighthood in the 1962 Birthday Honours and died at his home in London on 19 September 1963. His obituary in The Guardian described him as "the dominant cartoonist of the western world".

A blue plaque commemorates Low at 33 Melbury Court, Kensington.

=== Personal life ===
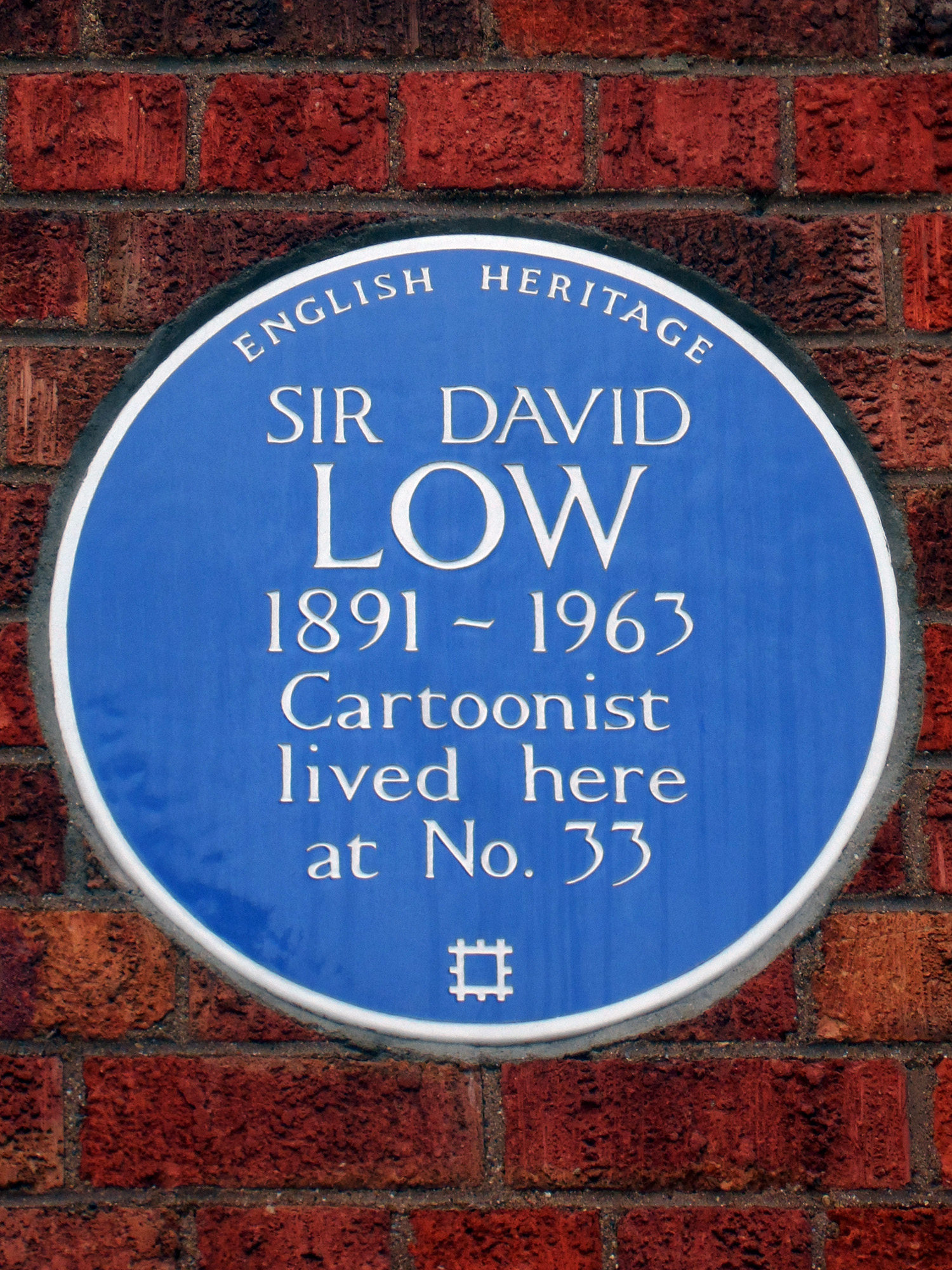
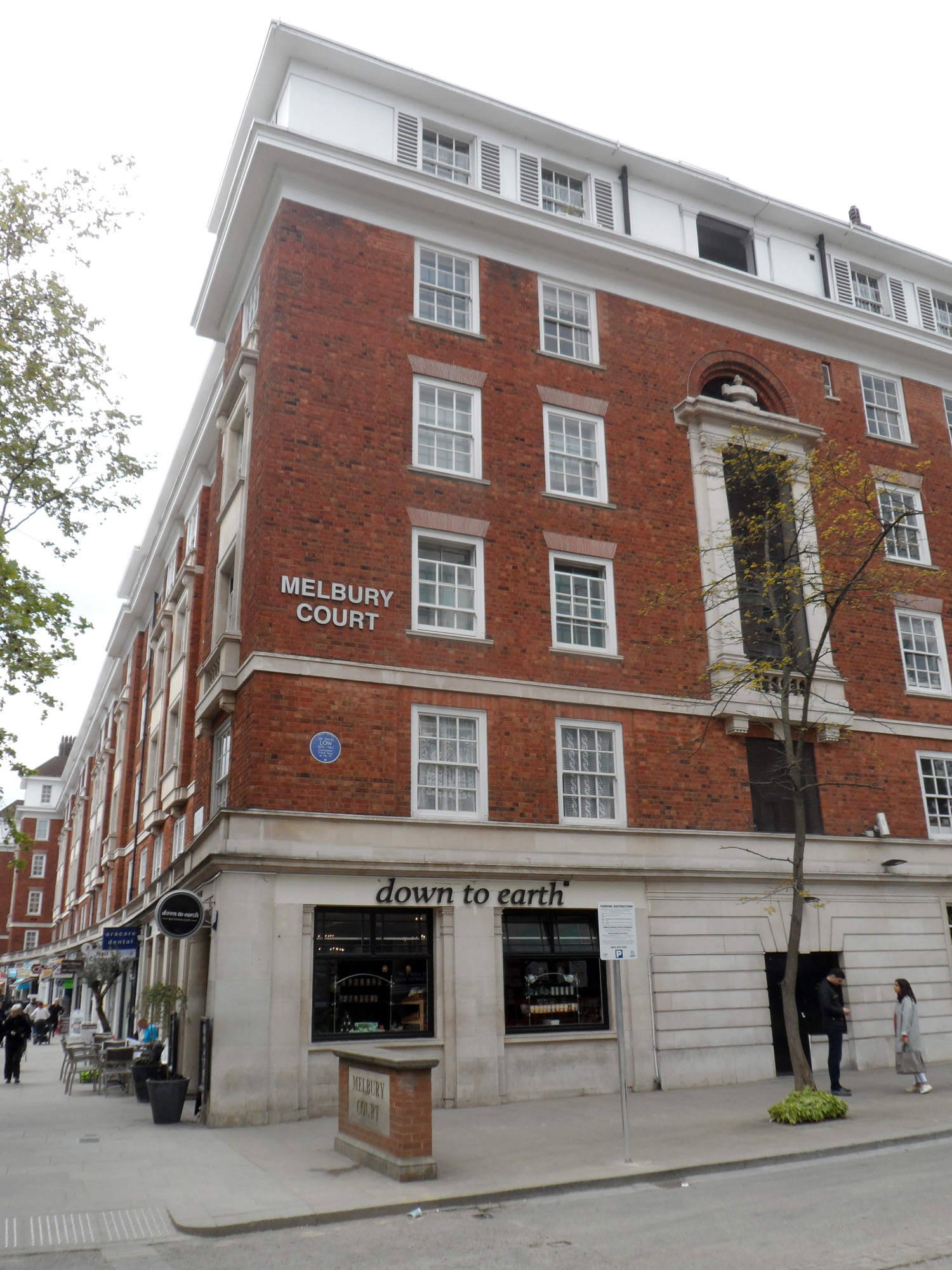
Left: The English Heritage blue plaque commemorating Low at Melbury Court on Kensington High Street
Right: Melbury Court in May 2015

Low married Madeline Grieve Kenning of Auckland on 7 June 1920 in St. Paul's Church, Covent Garden; they lived for many years in Golders Green, North London. The couple had two daughters: in 1939, Time described Low's breakfast as "a political meeting, with the cartoonist, his wife, and his two young daughters threshing out the news." His wife and daughters survived him. In 1991, a Blue plaque was erected to commemorate his life at Melbury Court, Kensington High Street, London, W8 6NH, in the Royal Borough of Kensington and Chelsea.

== Collections ==
United Kingdom

- British Cartoon Archive, University of Kent
- Political Cartoon Gallery, 16 Lower Richmond Road, London SW15 1JP – a collection of Low's original cartoons from the Evening Standard and The Manchester Guardian, as well as original caricatures from his New Statesman series.

Australia

Low's cartoons continued to appear in Australian papers after his move to England. See List of David Low's Cartoons in Australian Newspapers.

- National Library of Australia:
  - The Pictures Collection holds 57 original drawings and 22 photo-lithographs individually catalogued with a number digitised (including drawings relating to The Billy Book)
  - The Newspapers Collection holds many thousands of Low's cartoons, although none are digitised at present.

== Selected works ==
- Low's Annual (1908)
- Caricatures by Low (1915), New Zealand and Australian personalities
- The Billy Book (1918)
- Sketches by Low (1926)
- Lions and Lambs (1928)
- The Autocracy of Mr. Parham by H. G. Wells (1930), illustrator; German edition, Der Diktator (P. Zsolnay, 1931)
- Low's Russian Sketchbook (1932)
- Low & Terry (1934) with Horace Thorogood
- The Modern Rake's Progress (1934) with Rebecca West
- Low Again (1938)
- A Cartoon History of Our Times (1939)
- Europe since Versailles (1940)
- All behind you (1940)
- Europe at War (1941)
- The World at War (1942)
- Years of Wrath: A Cartoon History 1932–45 (1949)
- Low Visibility: A Cartoon History 1945–53 (1953)
- Autobiography (M. Joseph, 1956), 387 pp., LCCN 57-577
- The Fearful Fifties: A History of the Decade (1960)
- The Bedside Guardian 12: A Selection from the Guardian 1962-1963 (foreword/editor, 1963)
- Low and the Dictators (2009) by Timothy S. Benson
- David Low Censored (2019) by Timothy S. Benson, ISBN 9781999646844, Political Cartoon Society
