= Yan Petrovsky =

Russian neo-Nazi militant

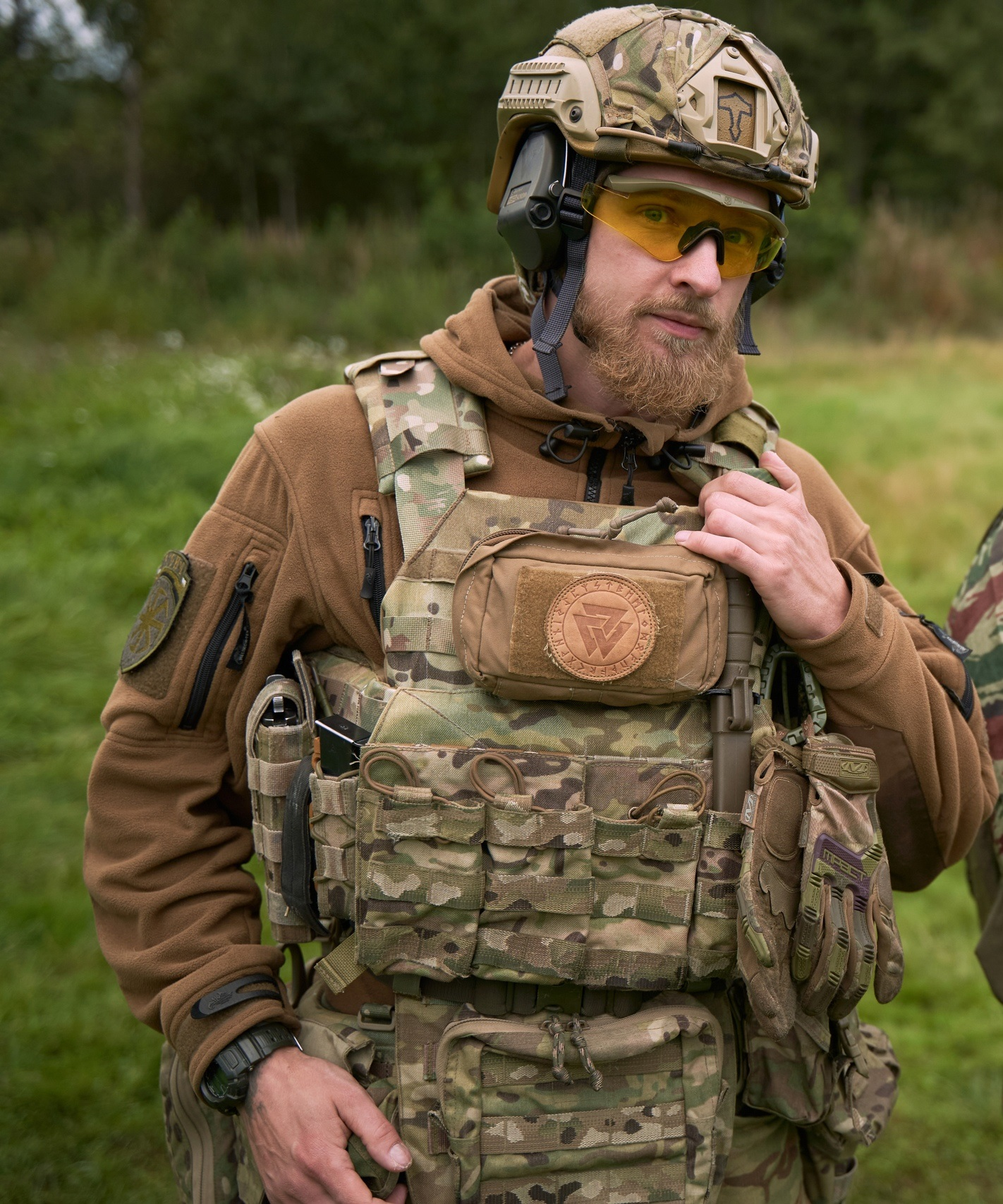
- Petrovsky in 2020
- Born: 1 January 1987 (age 39); Irkutsk, Russian SFSR, Soviet Union
- Other name: Voislav Torden
- Military career
- Allegiance: Luhansk People's Republic (2014–2015); Russia (2015–present)
- Branch: Rusich Group
- Nicknames: "Slavyan", "Veliky Slavyan"
- Commands: DShRG "Rusich" (2022)
- Conflicts: Russo-Ukrainian War; War in Donbas; Russian invasion of Ukraine; Syrian Civil War; Second Libyan Civil War; Western Libya campaign; Central African Republic Civil War

Yan Igorevich Petrovsky (Russian: Ян Игоревич Петровский, born 1 January 1987), also known by his nom de guerre "Slavyan" (Russian: Славян, lit. 'Slav') and his new legal name Voislav Torden (Russian: Воислав Торден), is a Russian neo-Nazi, militant and convicted war criminal, known for being a leader of the far-right Rusich Group paramilitary unit.

Presumably, Yan Petrovsky is designated as the commander of the Zimargl detachment of the Rusich Group, "one of the special separate units formed for operational and reconnaissance tasks on the territory of Ukraine". According to the US Department of the Treasury, in 2022 he took over as commander of the Group after the leader Alexey Milchakov was wounded near Kharkiv.

Petrovsky was arrested in Finland in July 2023 at the request of the Ukrainian government, who sought to extradite him for war crimes committed during the war in Donbas. The extradition request was rejected due to human rights concerns, but Petrovsky was arrested and charged for the same crimes by the Finnish authorities, who claimed universal jurisdiction over the case. On 14 March 2025 Petrovsky was sentenced to life imprisonment. On appeal this was reduced to 12 and a half years imprisonment.

== Biography ==
Yan Petrovsky was born in 1987 in Irkutsk, Russian SFSR. With his mother, he moved to St. Petersburg. As a child, he was fond of history and participated in the reconstruction of medieval battles. He was going to study as an architect or graphic designer in Russia, but in 2004 his mother married a Norwegian. Petrovsky left Russia with her. He studied in Oslo as a graphic designer.

After graduating from university, Petrovsky began working at the "True Metal Tattoo" tattoo parlor, an institution famous for regular gatherings of Neo-Nazis from Eastern Europe. Petrovsky patrolled the streets of Tønsberg as part of the Soldiers of Odin and was involved with the neo-Nazi Nordic Resistance Movement. In 2010, the police carried out a raid there. Petrovsky and his associates were detained. During a search in the parlor, forged documents and weapons were found. The police found that the weapon belonged to the Russian radical nationalist Viacheslav Datsik.

Petrovsky is tattooed in pagan and nationalist symbolics: Black Sun, Valknut and various runes. In an interview for Novorossiya TV in 2015 he explained he came to Ukraine to fight against "Khazar kaghanate".

Milchakov and Petrovsky met at a paramilitary training program of the terrorist group Russian Imperial Movement.

In 2014, he went to Donbas, where he fought against the Ukrainian army. During this period, pictures appeared on the Internet in which Petrovsky poses against the background of deceased Ukrainian soldiers. In the summer of 2015, Rusich Group fighters announced that they were leaving Donbass. One of the reasons of Rusich leaving the fighting was a conflict with the leader of the Luhansk People's Republic, Igor Plotnitsky.

NRK also reports Petrovsky's participation in the Syrian civil war on the side of President Bashar al-Assad.

In 2016, Yan Petrovsky was deprived of a residence permit in Norway because he stayed abroad too long, and was arrested for violating immigration laws, after which he was deported. The Norwegian authorities called Petrovsky a "threat to the security" of the country. Petrovsky was arrested at the home of a leading Nordic Resistance Movement member Ronny Bårdsen. Petrovsky also built a close relationship with the Finnish far-right.

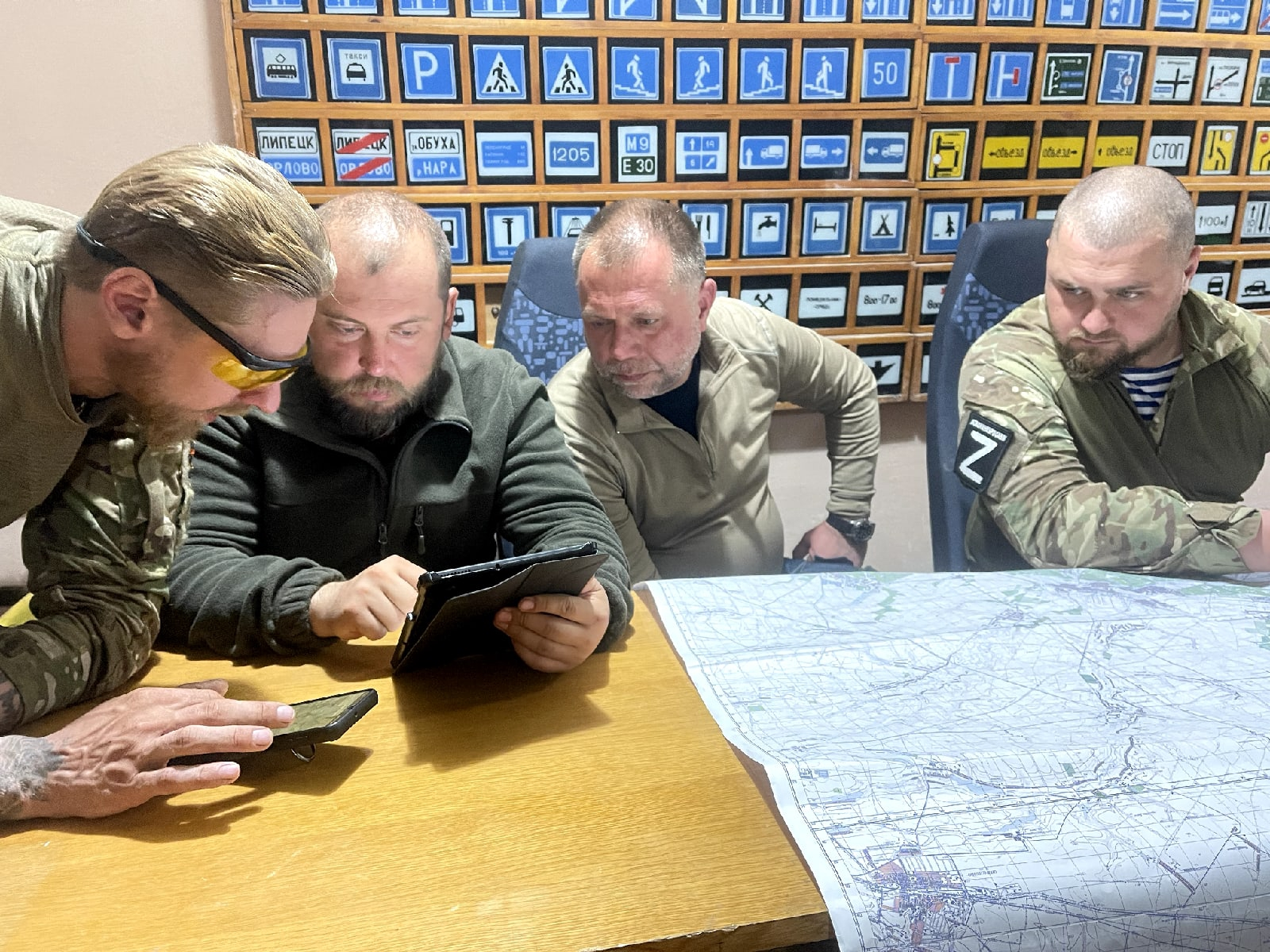
Yan Petrovsky and Alexander Borodai in Kharkiv Oblast. Between them is Alexey Sosonnyy, the commander of the Viking Battalion.

Since 2015, he has been an active member of the Union of Donbass Volunteers. In 2020, he was appointed head of the Northwestern branch of the Union.

In 2017, he became head of the Military Patriotic Club Rusich, which cooperates intimately with the 76th Air Assault Division.

From the very beginning of the Russo-Ukrainian war, he commanded the Zimargl reconnaissance unit, which invaded the Kharkiv Oblast through a checkpoint near the village of Pletenivka. He was in charge of the Rusich Group after Milchakov was wounded.

In June 2022, Petrovsky appeared at the funeral of Rusich soldier captain Alexey Pozharov, Fontanka wrote. There, he actually confirmed the participation of the Rusich Group in the Russian invasion of Ukraine.

Petrovsky was involved in providing Sierra Leone's president Julius Maada Bio with military support and bringing him to power.

=== Arrest and trial in Finland ===
On 20 July 2023, Yan Petrovsky was arrested by the Finnish police in Helsinki-Vantaa Airport. Ukraine requested the extradition of Yan Petrovsky. The Russian Embassy in Helsinki told RIA Novosti that it had been informed about “the detention of a Russian national in Finland at Kyiv’s request” and that it was “taking measures to provide consular assistance.” Later, Rusich Group announced on its Telegram channel that the task force was halting “any combat missions” until “Slavyan” (Petrovsky) was extradited to Russia.

Petrovsky had entered Finland under the name of Voislav Torden with his wife and three children on 19 July through the Vaalimaa border crossing. According to Petrovsky's lawyer, his intention was that his children "obtain Nordic education" and his wife was already offered a place to study in one of Finnish universities. Petrovsky also visited Finland on tourist visa in 2022 under the new identity of Torden, hoping to visit family in France before they settled in Finland, and Petrovsky was only detained on 20 July in Helsinki airport, shortly before their flight to France. According to Petrovsky's legal counsel, he was only involved in "political activity" in Ukraine but Finnish media referred to a number of interviews Petrovsky gave in Russia, describing his military activities as a combatant during the war in Donbas. In October 2023 the efforts to release Petrovsky from the detainment centre by his lawyers continued, but a Finnish court upheld the decision for him to remain detained until the extradition ruling is made.

The Supreme Court of Finland rejected Ukraine's extradition request, citing "conditions in Ukrainian prisons", ordering Petrovsky's release from Finnish prison on December 8, 2023. He was taken into custody by the Finnish Border Guard, with the Prosecutor General of Finland and Police of Finland looking into the possibility of opening a criminal case against him within the Finnish legal framework on charges of war crimes committed against surrendered Ukrainian soldiers. On 18 December, a Finnish court ordered Petrovsky remanded in custody, pending charges of aggravated war crimes.

The investigation was concluded on 11 October 2024, and on 31 October Petrovsky was formally charged with war crimes. The charges related to a September 2014 ambush against a Ukrainian unit which Petrovsky and several other Rusich soldiers participated in alongside other pro-Russian units. The soldiers had deceived the Ukrainians by raising a Ukrainian flag before attacking them, killing 22 and wounding four. One Ukrainian soldier, Ivan Issyk, had a kolovrat symbol carved into his cheek by the soldiers; he later died of his injuries. Another soldier who was killed during the engagement had pictures of his body posted on social media by Petrovsky himself.

On 14 March 2025 Petrovsky was convicted of four of the five charges against him. He was acquitted of organising the illegal ambush on the grounds that other militant groups had led the operation, but was found guilty of murder, mutilation and publishing degrading images of the dead. Petrovsky was sentenced to life imprisonment, and was ordered to pay compensation to the family of one of the victims. On appeal this was reduced to 12 and a half years imprisonment.

== International sanctions ==
In 2022, the Rusich Group and its commanders Milchakov and Petrovsky were included in the US sanctions list for their "special cruelty" in the battles in the Kharkiv Oblast.
