= Alexey Milchakov =

Russian neo-Nazi (born 1991)

- Алексей Юрьевич Мильчаков
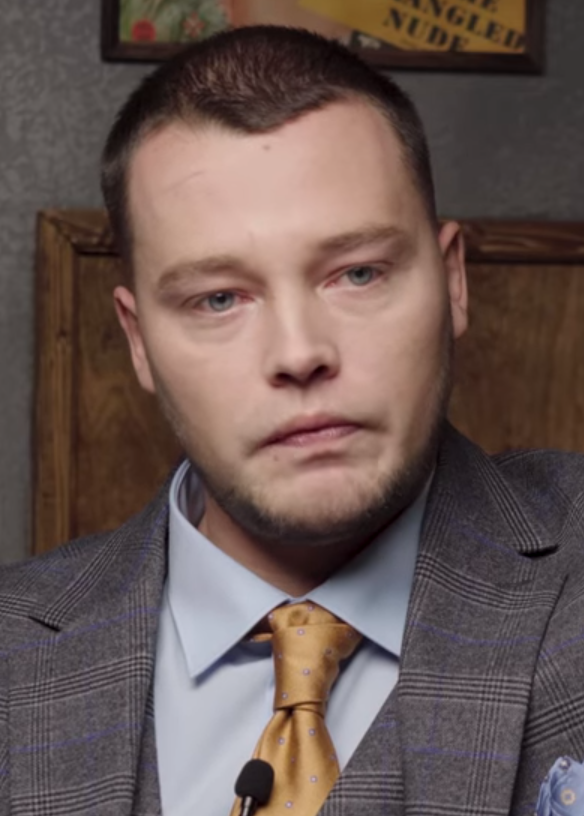
- Milchakov in 2020
- Born: 30 April 1991 (age 35); Leningrad, Russian SFSR, Soviet Union
- Military career
- Allegiance: Luhansk People's Republic (2014–2015); Russia (2015–present)
- Branch: Russian Airborne Troops; Army of the South-East (2014); ENOT Corp; Wagner Group
- Nicknames: "Serb", "Fritz"
- Units: Rapid Response Group "Batman" (2014); DShRG "Rusich" (2014–present)
- Commands: DShRG "Rusich"
- Conflicts: Russo-Ukrainian War; War in Donbas; Russian invasion of Ukraine; Syrian Civil War; Second Libyan Civil War; Western Libya campaign; Central African Republic Civil War

Alexey Yurievich Milchakov (Russian: Алексей Юрьевич Мильчаков, born 30 April 1991) is a Russian neo-Nazi, suspected war criminal, and co-leader and co-founder of the Rusich Group, that operated from 2022 within the Wagner Group.

Milchakov first came to public attention in 2011, after he filmed himself torturing and decapitating a puppy, then eating it, and posted footage of it online.

He has been linked to atrocities in both Syria and Ukraine, including the participation in beating a man to death with a sledgehammer, and has been described as "the symbol of Russian neo-Nazis fighting in the Donbas".

As of 2022, he was sanctioned by the United States, the European Union, the United Kingdom, Canada and other countries.

== Biography ==
He was born in Leningrad (now St. Petersburg). Milchakov calls himself a fan of FC Zenit.

=== Animal abuse ===
Milchakov first came to public attention after he filmed himself torturing and decapitating a puppy, then eating it, in 2011, posting the footage online. A petition calling to hold him accountable was supported by more than 5,500 people. At the same time, animal rights activists addressed FC Zenit players in order for them to assess Milchakov's actions. In his VK page he also called for killing of homeless people, puppies and children.

=== Alleged actions in Syria ===
Interview with Milchakov

A 2024 investigation by the open source research group Bellingcat analyzed a 2017 photograph that depicted a man in military uniform holding a severed human head near the Syrian city of Palmyra. By comparing the camouflage patterns, Bellingcat concluded the uniform was likely worn by Milchakov or a member of Rusich. Bellingcat geolocated the photograph and found it was 5.5 km away from where Wagner mercenaries tortured and beheaded a Syrian man in 2017.

=== War in Donbas ===
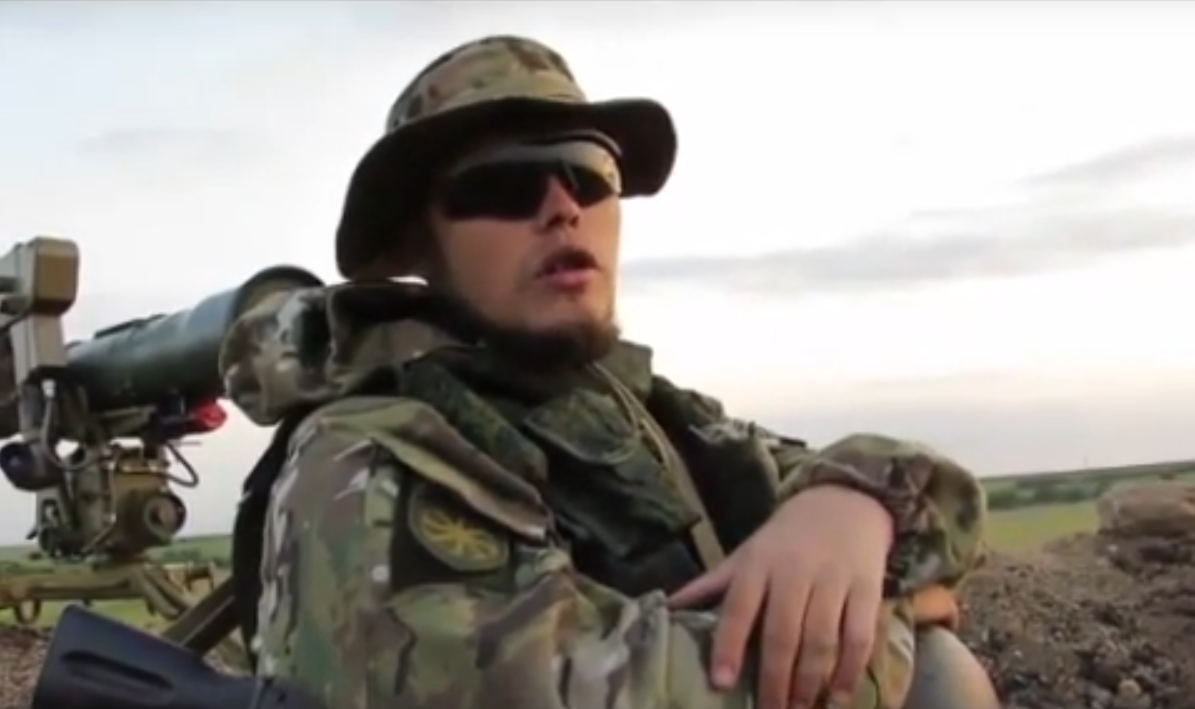
Milchakov in Donbas

Milchakov participated as a volunteer in the war in Donbas from 2014, stating later he wanted "to kill". According to his own account, Milchakov formed Rusich together with Yan Petrovsky in the summer of 2014, after going through a paramilitary training program run by the Imperial Legion, the military branch of the Russian Imperial Movement. He has openly bragged about photographing mutilated and burnt Ukrainian bodies of members of the paramilitary Aidar group in 2014. Milchakov is also reputed to have cut ears of Ukrainian corpses and scratched swastikas on their faces. By 2015, he had been sanctioned by the European Union, United Kingdom and Canada. He has used the call signs "Fritz" and "Serb".

In 2016 Milchakov criticized the leadership of the Luhansk People's Republic for ostensible "anti-fascism".

In a 2020 video, Milchakov described himself as a "Nazi", stating: "I'm not going to go deep and say, I'm a nationalist, a patriot, an imperialist, and so forth. I'll say it outright: I'm a Nazi."

In August 2022, Nexta posted a tweet of footage showing Milchakov in Ukraine. According to the German Intelligence Service, Milchakov was allegedly injured in the Russian invasion of Ukraine.

Around October 2023, Milchakov admitted in an interview that in 2014, near Novosvitlivka, Luhansk Oblast, they captured a Ukrainian soldier with a "Glory to Ukraine" tattoo on his arm. Russian servicemen cut off his arm and then "pickled it in a jar as a souvenir" and then "rode him on a tank". In same interview Milchakov calls for mass executions of Ukrainian prisoners of war because later this prisoner "appeared on the air of Ukrainian media", where he declared that "even with one hand" he was ready to continue fighting for his country. "He should have been shot. Who knows what harm this scumbag can do to us" said Milchakov.

In January 2025, Apti Alaudinov recorded a meeting with Milchakov. They spoke together of their "common enemy" and "common goal" in the war, as well as the need to subdue interracial and interethnic tensions in the Russian military.

== Sanctions ==
Milchakov was sanctioned by Canada in 2015, and by Australia, the European Union, Japan, New Zealand, Ukraine, the United Kingdom and the United States in relation to the Russian invasion of Ukraine.
