= The Autocracy of Mr. Parham =

1930 novel by H.G. Wells

- Cover of the British first edition
- Author: H. G. Wells
- Original title: The Autocracy of Mr. Parham: His Remarkable Adventures in This Changing World
- Illustrator: Low (cartoonist David Low)
- Cover artist: Low
- Language: English
- Genre: Satire
- Publisher: W. Heinemann; Doubleday, Doran (US)
- Publication date: 21 July 1930 (UK); 20 June 1930 (US)
- Publication place: United Kingdom
- Pages: 370 (UK); 328 (US)
- LC Class: PR5774 .A8 1930 (UK) PZ3.W465 Au PR5774 (US)

The Autocracy of Mr. Parham is a novel by H. G. Wells. It was originally published in both Britain and America with illustrations by the British cartoonist Low (David Low).

The U.S. edition carried the subtitle His Remarkable Adventures in This Changing World. It was one of the first twenty "dollar books" from Doubleday, Doran & Co., released together 20 June 1930. (It was listed first in a newspaper advertisement that day, and subsequently numbered '1' in advertisement of all the dollar books with a simple numerical order form.) The U.K. edition from Heinemann was available 21 July 1930.

A German translation by Helene Maria Reiff was published by Paul Zsolnay of Berlin in 1931, Der Diktator oder Mr. Parham wird allmächtig (The Dictator).

== Plot summary ==
Mr. Parham is a university don with solid right-wing convictions who dreams of finding a rich benefactor to finance a review he can edit. He thinks he has found such a man in Sir Bussy Woodcock, a "crude plutocrat" who makes money at anything to which he puts his hand. In an attempt to foster this acquaintance that goes on for six years, Mr. Parham finds himself involved in séances that summon a Master Spirit from the beyond. This entity occupies Mr. Parham's body, and commences to inspire a political movement (the League of Duty Paramount) that overthrows the British government in a coup d'état. As "Lord Paramount", Mr. Parham undertakes to conquer the world. But the opposition of the United States ultimately leads to a "Second World War" that goes badly for Britain. Believing that he can win if he overcomes the resistance of industrialists who control a new poison gas ("Gas L") but who refuse to make it available to the military, Lord Paramount attacks their stronghold ... and it is at this point that Mr. Parham reawakens from what has been a wild dream he had when he fell asleep during the séance. Shortly thereafter he discovers that Sir Bussy has never had any intention of conferring an editorship upon him, and the association of the "deflated publicist" and the millionaire is over.

== Composition and reception ==
Sir Bussy Woodcock was a recognizable caricature of Beaverbrook, and other characters correspond to Joynson-Hicks and Oswald Mosley.

Wells had trouble placing the novel with a publisher because sales of his novels had declined in recent years, but The Autocracy of Mr. Parham proved to be "one of Wells's better sellers in years". Bertrand Russell told Wells that he liked the book, but French reviews were unkind.
