= Salute =

Gesture or action used to display respect

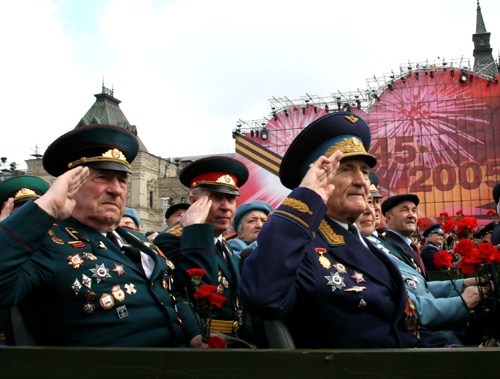
Soviet veterans saluting in the 2005 Moscow Victory Day Parade

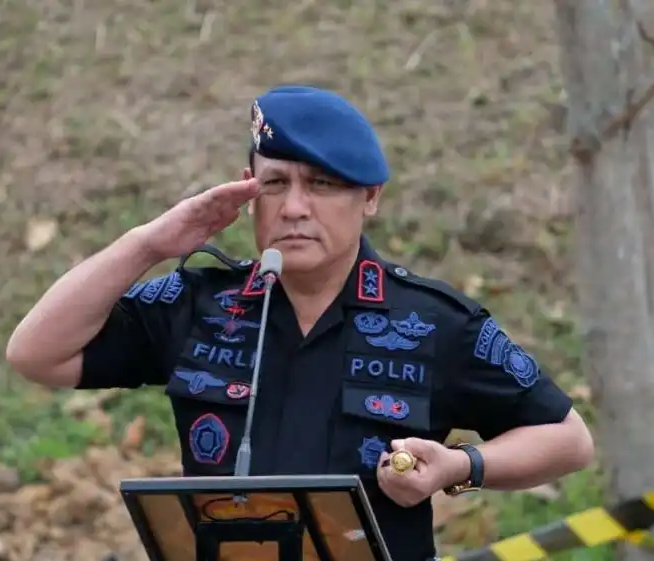
An Indonesian National Police general giving a salute

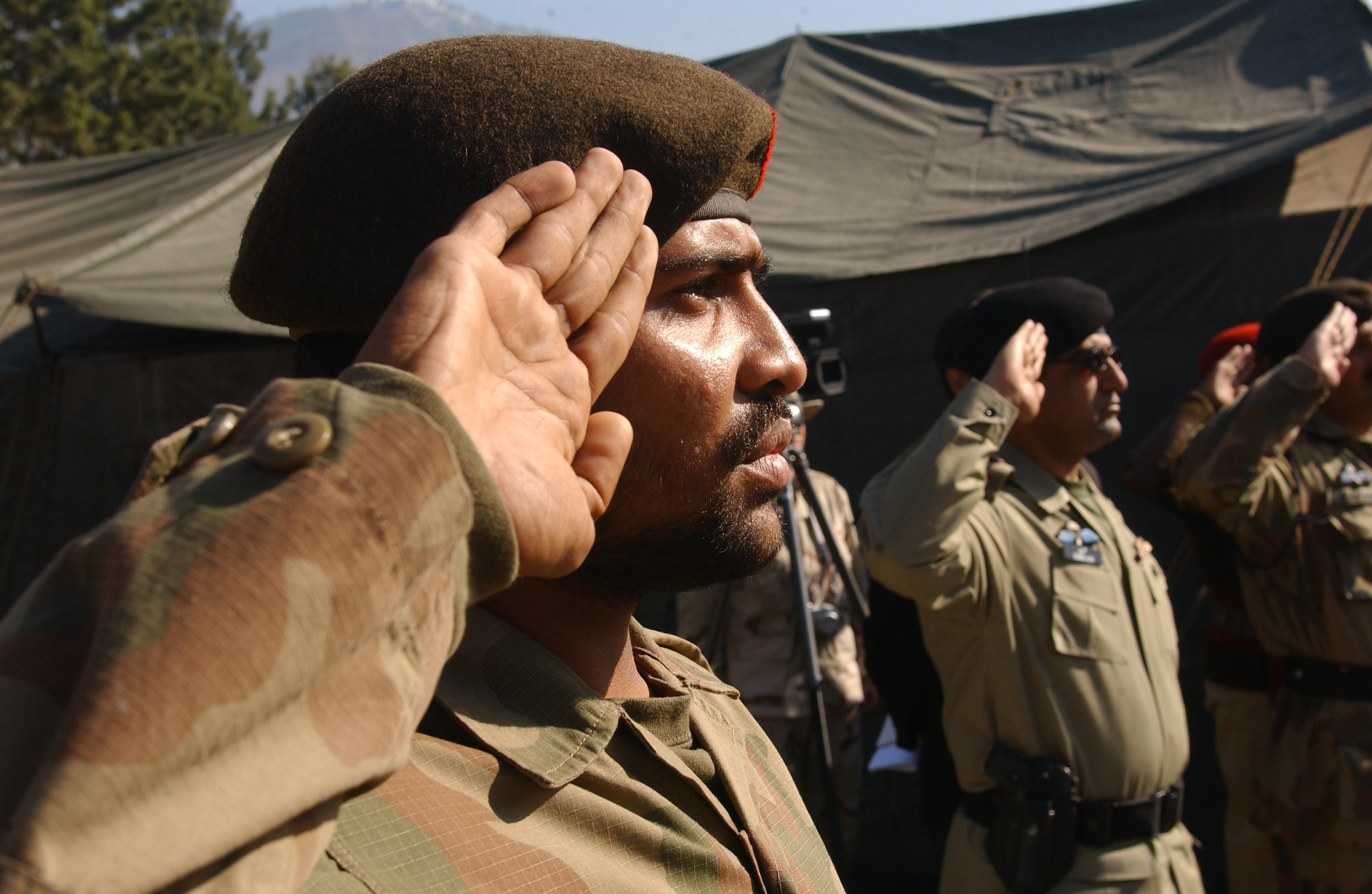
Pakistan army soldiers saluting British-style, palms facing outward

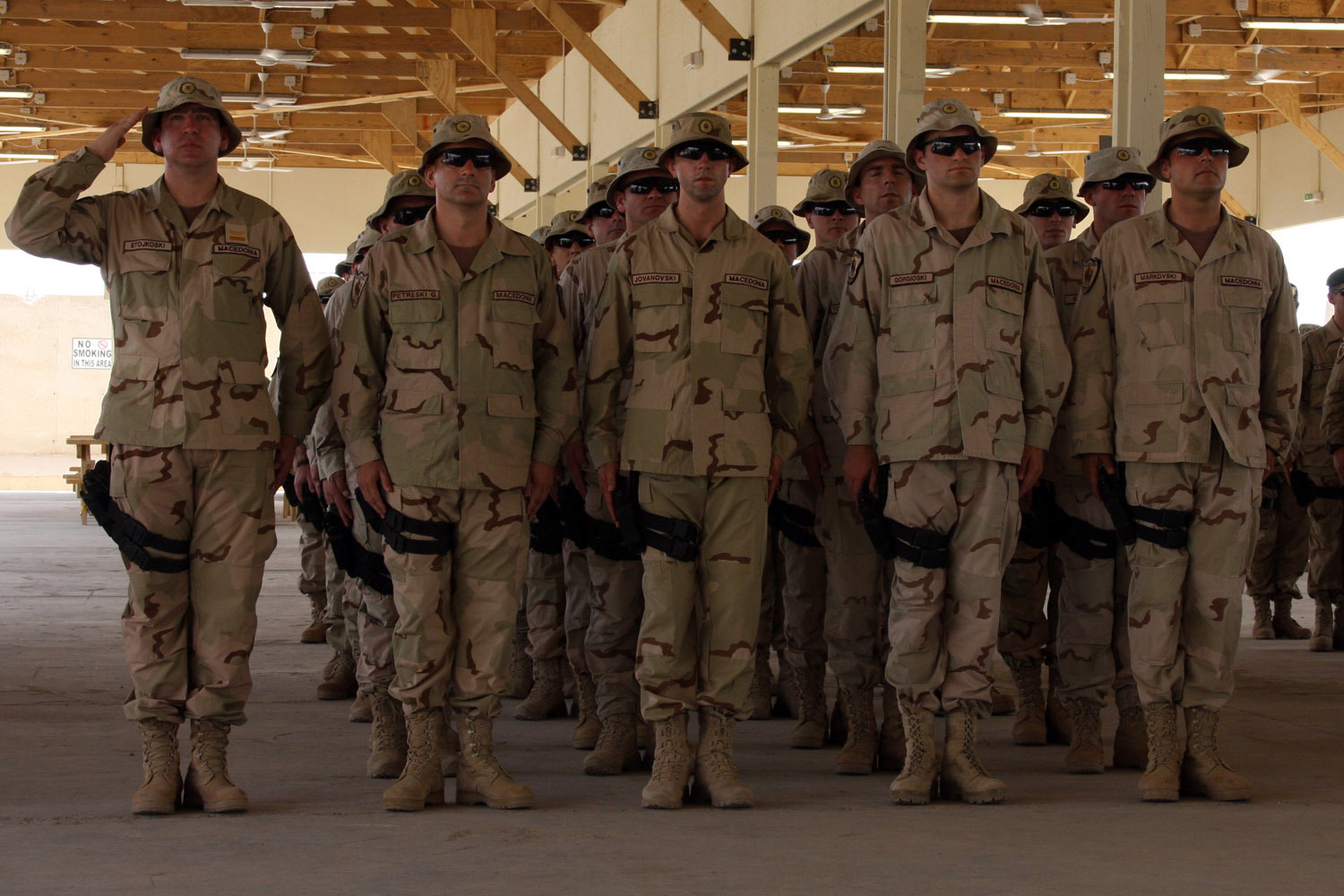
Macedonian soldier saluting on behalf of his men during a performance of the Macedonian national anthem

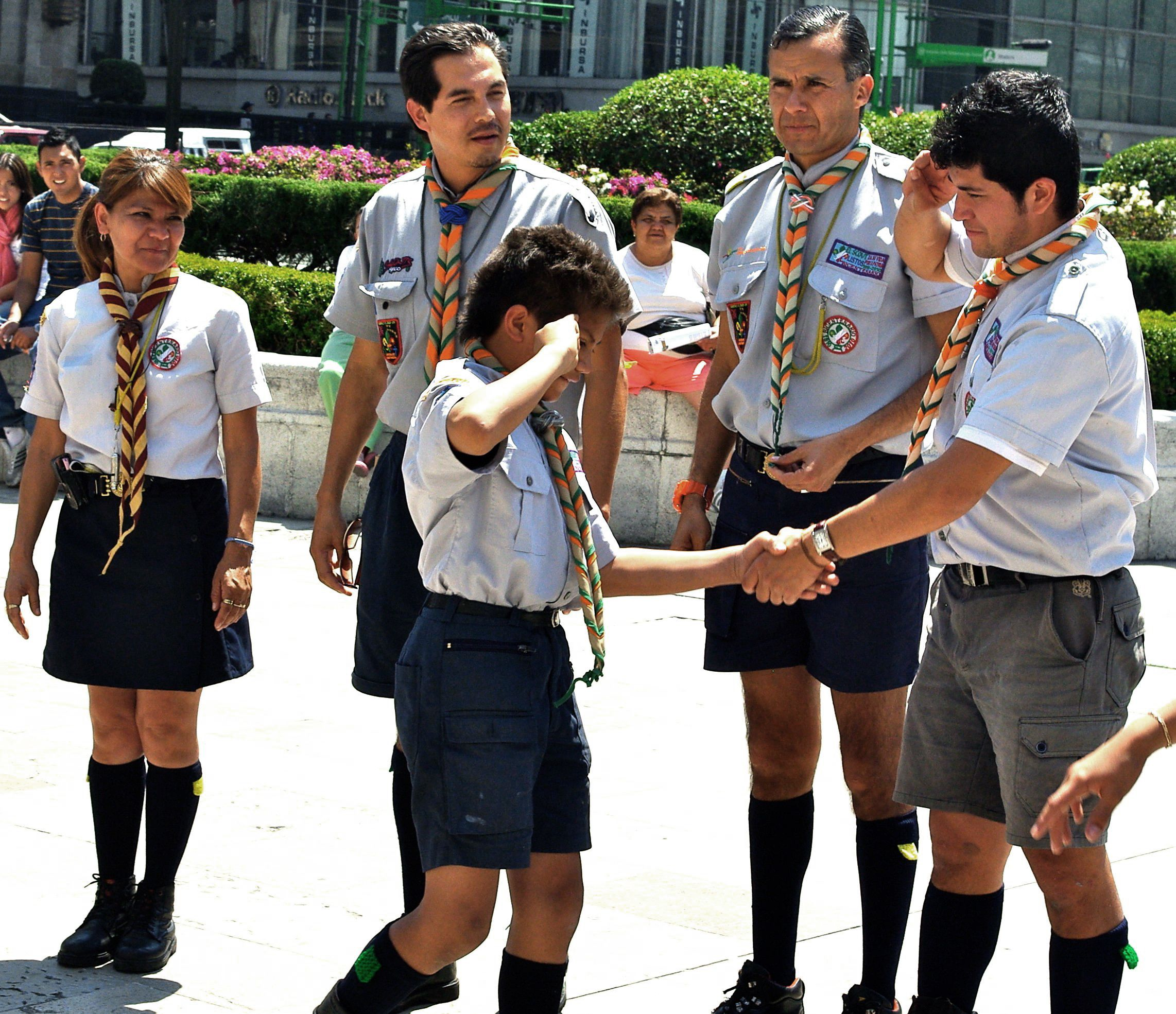
Scouting leader and a new Scout exchange salutes.

A salute is usually a formal hand gesture or other action used to display respect in military situations. Salutes are primarily associated with the military and law enforcement, but many civilian organizations, such as Girl Guides, Boy Scouts and the Salvation Army use formal salutes. Ordinary civilians also salute informally to greet or acknowledge the presence of another person, such as a tip of the hat or a hand wave to a friend or neighbor.

== Military salutes ==
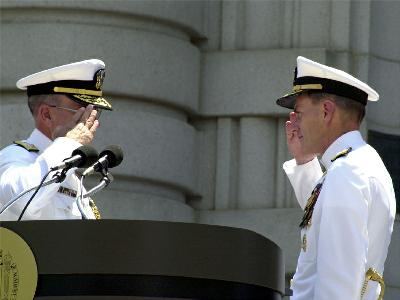
Admirals Jay L. Johnson and Vern Clark of the United States Navy salute each other during a change of command ceremony. Clark is replacing Johnson as Chief of Naval Operations.

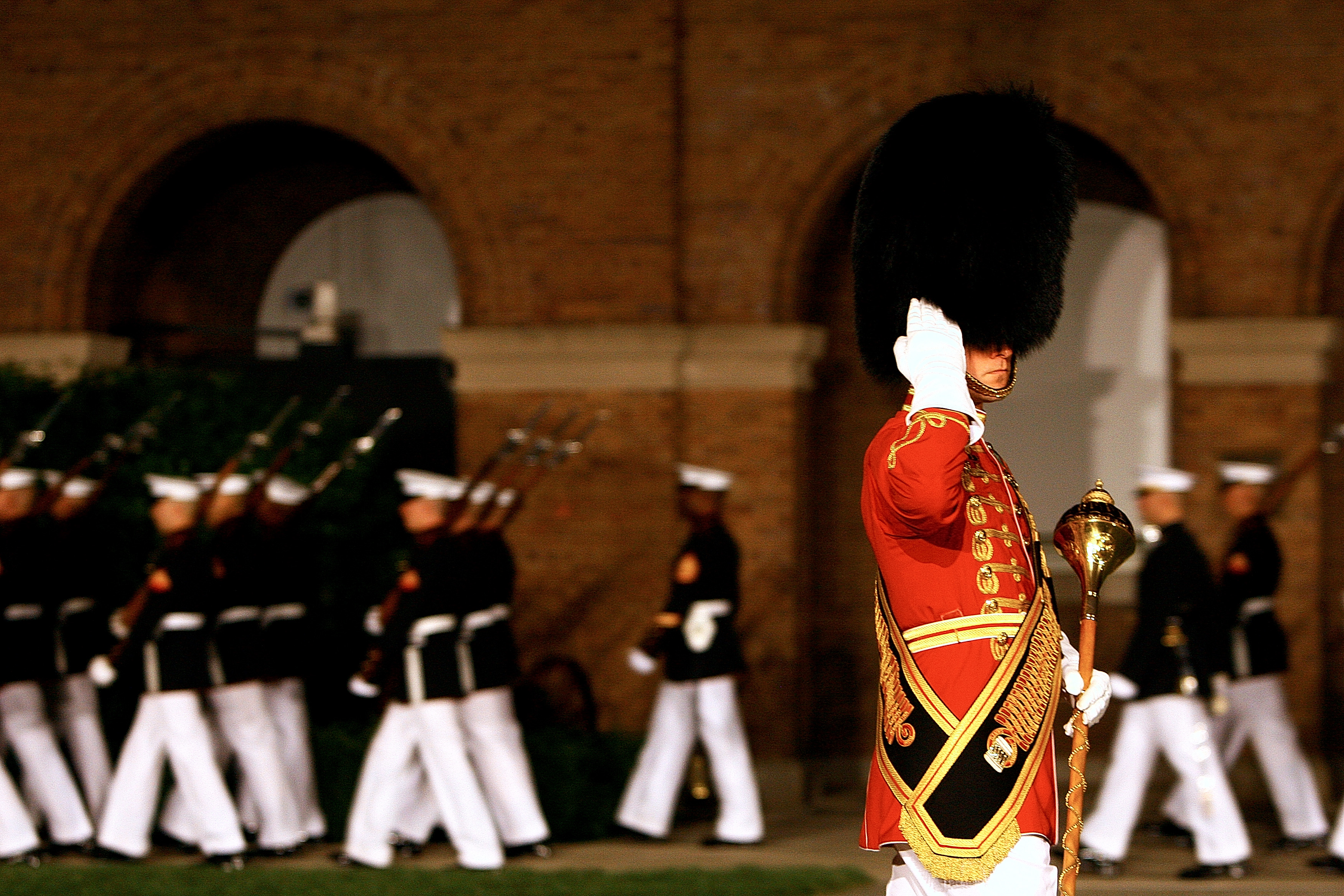
Gunnery Sergeant Duane King of the United States Marine Band salutes during a pass in review at the Friday Evening Parade at Marine Barracks Washington D.C. in 2012.

Throughout history, military organizations have used many methods to perform salutes. Depending on the situation, a salute could be a hand or body gesture, cannon or rifle shots, hoisting of flags, removing headgear, or other means of showing respect or deference.

=== Hand salutes ===
==== Origin ====
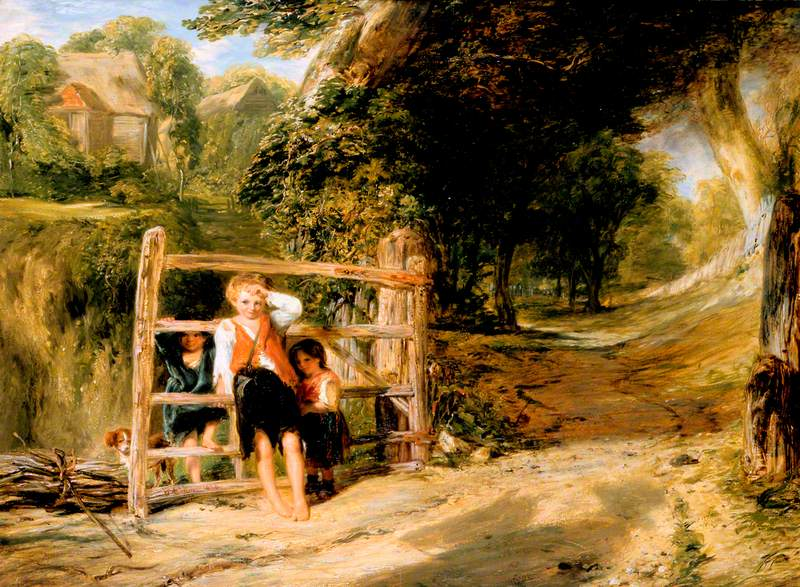
Rustic Civility by William Collins showing a child "tugging his forelock" as a person of higher standing passes on horseback (only visible by the shadow)

The origin of the hand salute is uncertain. It may have begun in late Roman antiquity when assassinations were common. A citizen who wished to approach an official had to do so with his right hand raised to show that he did not have a weapon. Centuries later, it became traditional for knights wearing armor to raise their visors when passing on horseback. Others also note that the raising of one's visor was a way to identify oneself. Medieval visors were equipped with a protruding spike that allowed it to be raised using a saluting motion.

Some historians believe that the salute originated in Ancient Rome, where it was called salutatio militaris. According to artwork, this salute was performed in the same fashion as today.

A British order book from 1745 states: "The men are ordered not to pull off their hats when they pass an officer, or to speak to them, but only to clap up their hands to their hats and bow as they pass." Over time, it became conventionalized into something resembling the modern hand salute. In the Austrian Army, the practice of making a hand salute replaced that of removing the headdress in 1790, although officers wearing cocked hats continued to remove them when greeting superiors until 1868.

The British naval salute is said to have developed because the palms of sailors were often covered with tar and pitch, so Queen Victoria required that the palm be turned downwards. During the Napoleonic Wars, British naval crews saluted officers by touching a clenched fist to the brow as though grasping a hat-brim between fingers and thumb.

Hand salutes are normally carried out by bringing the right hand to the head in some way, the precise manner varying between countries and sometimes among various branches of the armed forces of the same country. The British Army's salute is almost identical to the French salute, with the palm facing outward. The customary salute in the Polish Armed Forces is the two-fingers salute, a variation of the British military salute with only two fingers extended. In the Russian military, the right hand is brought to the right temple with palm down, not quite touching; the head has to be covered. In the Hellenic Army salute, the palm is facing down and the fingers point to the coat of arms.

In many militaries, hand salutes are given only when headgear is worn, usually a hat.

=== Small arms salutes ===
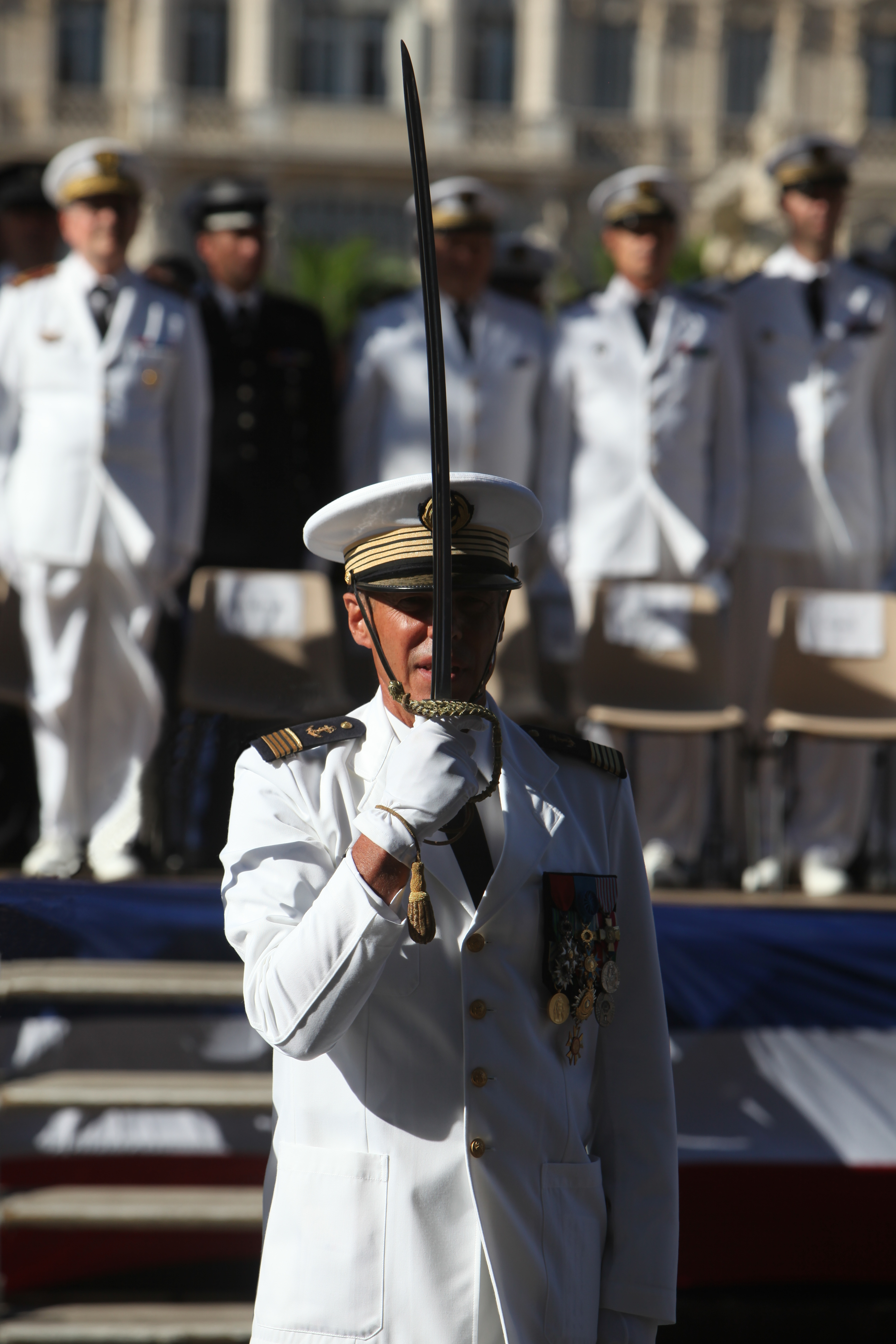
A captain of the French Navy salutes by holding the flat of his saber to his face during the ceremonies of the 14th of July in Toulon.

When carrying a sword, still done on ceremonial occasions, European military forces and their cultural descendants use a two-step gesture. The sword is first raised, in the right hand, to the level of and close to the front of the neck. The blade is inclined forward and up 30 degrees from the vertical; the true edge is to the left. Then the sword is slashed downward to a position with the point close to the ground in front of the right foot. The blade is inclined down and forward with the true edge to the left. This gesture originated in the Crusades. The hilt of a sword formed a cross with the blade, so if a crucifix was not available, a Crusader could kiss the hilt of his sword when praying, before entering battle, for oaths and vows, and so on. The lowering of the point to the ground is a traditional act of submission.

In fencing, the fencers salute each other before putting their masks on to begin a bout. There are several methods of doing this, but the most common is to bring the sword in front of the face so that the blade is pointing up in front of the nose. The fencers also salute the referee and the audience.

When armed with a rifle, two methods are available when saluting. The usual method is called "present arms"; the rifle is brought to the vertical, muzzle up, in front of the center of the chest with the trigger away from the body. The hands hold the stock close to the positions they would have if the rifle were being fired, though the trigger is not touched. Less formal salutes include the "order arms salute" and the "shoulder arms salutes." These are most often given by a sentry to a low-ranking superior who does not rate the full "present arms" salute. In the "order arms salute," the rifle rests on its butt by the sentry's right foot, held near the muzzle by the sentry's right hand, and does not move. The sentry brings his flattened left hand across his body and touches the rifle near its muzzle. When the rifle is being carried on the shoulder, a similar gesture is used in which the flattened free hand is brought across the body to touch the rifle near the rear of the receiver.

A different type of salute with a rifle is a ritual firing performed during military funerals, known as a three-volley salute. In this ceremonial act, an odd number of riflemen fire three blank cartridges in unison into the air over the casket. This originates from an old European tradition wherein a battle was halted to remove the dead and wounded, then three shots were fired to signal readiness to re-engage.

=== Heavy arms: gun salutes ===
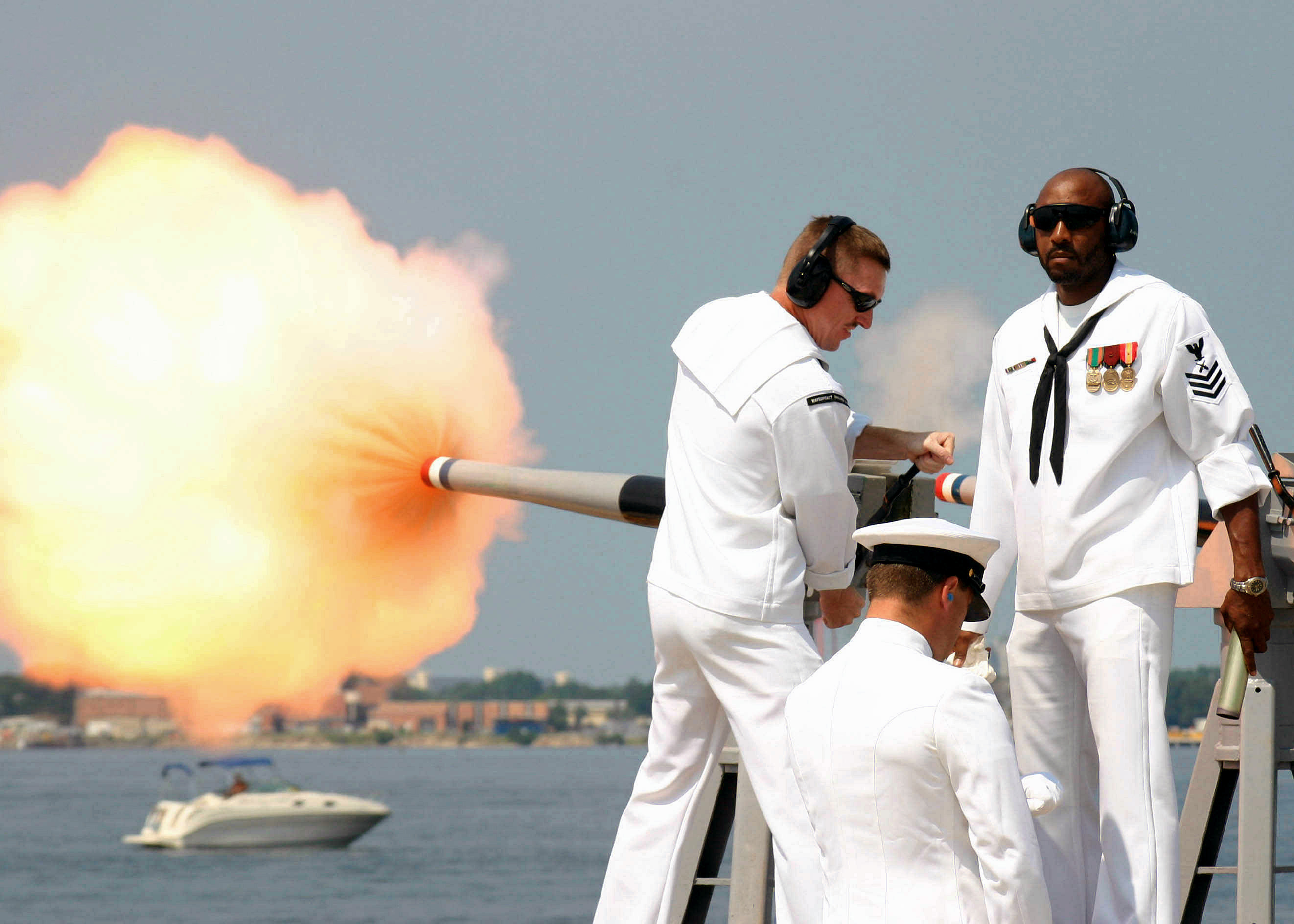
A cannon on a naval vessel's deck fired during the arrival of a dignitary

A gun salute or cannon salute is the use of a piece of artillery to fire shots, often 21 in number for higher ranks (21-gun salute), with the aim of marking an honor or celebrating a joyful event. It is a tradition in many countries around the world.

=== By country ===
==== Australia and New Zealand ====
In the Commonwealth of Nations, only commissioned officers are saluted, and the salute is to the commission they carry from their respective commanders-in-chief representing the monarch, not the officers themselves.

In both countries, the right-hand salute is generally identical to, and drawn from the traditions of, the British armed forces. The salute of the Australian or New Zealand Army is best described as the right arm taking the path of the longest way up and then the shortest way down. Similar in many ways, the salute of the Royal Australian Air Force and Royal New Zealand Air Force takes the longest way up and the shortest way down. The Royal Australian Navy and Royal New Zealand Navy, however, take the shortest way up, palm down, and the shortest way down. The action of the arm rotating up is slower than the action of the conclusion of the salute which is the arm being quickly "snapped" down to the saluter's side. Junior members are required to salute first and the senior member is obliged to return the compliment. Protocol dictates that the monarch, members of the royal family, the governor-general, and state governors are to be saluted at all times by all ranks. Except where a drill manual (or parade) protocol dictates otherwise, the duration of the salute is timed at three beats of the quick-time march (approximately 1.5 seconds), timed from the moment the senior member first returns it. In situations where cover (or "headdress", as it is called in the Australian Army) is not being worn, the salute is given verbally; the junior party (or at least the senior member thereof) will first come to attention, then offer the salute "Good morning/afternoon Your Majesty/Your Royal Highness/Prime Minister/Your Grace/Sir/Ma'am", etc., as the case may be. It is this, rather than the act of standing to attention, which indicates that a salute is being offered. If either party consists of two or more members, all will come to attention, but only the most senior member of the party will offer (or return) the physical or verbal salute. The party wearing headdress must always offer, or respond with, a full salute. But within the Forward Edge of the Battle Area (FEBA) no salutes of any kind are given, under any circumstances; it is always sensible to assume that there are snipers in the area who may see or overhear. In this case, parties personally known to each other are addressed familiarly by their first or given names, regardless of rank; senior officers are addressed as one might address a stranger, courteously, but without any naming or mark of respect.

==== Canada ====
Much as the British salute described above (except the palm is level with the ground, without the U.S.A. slight over-rotation of the wrist), the Canadian military salutes to demonstrate a mark of respect and courtesy for the commissioned ranks. When in uniform and not wearing headdress one does not salute. Instead, compliments shall be paid by standing at attention. If on the march, arms shall be swung and the head turned to the left or right as required.

On Remembrance Day, 2009, Charles, Prince of Wales attended the national ceremony in Ottawa with Governor General Michaëlle Jean—both wearing Canadian military dress. CBC live television coverage of the event noted that, when Prince Charles saluted, he performed the Canadian form of the salute with a cupped hand (the British "naval salute"—appropriate, as he did his military service as an officer in the Royal Navy), adopted by all elements of the Canadian Forces after unification in 1968, rather than the British (Army) form with the palm facing forward.

==== Denmark ====
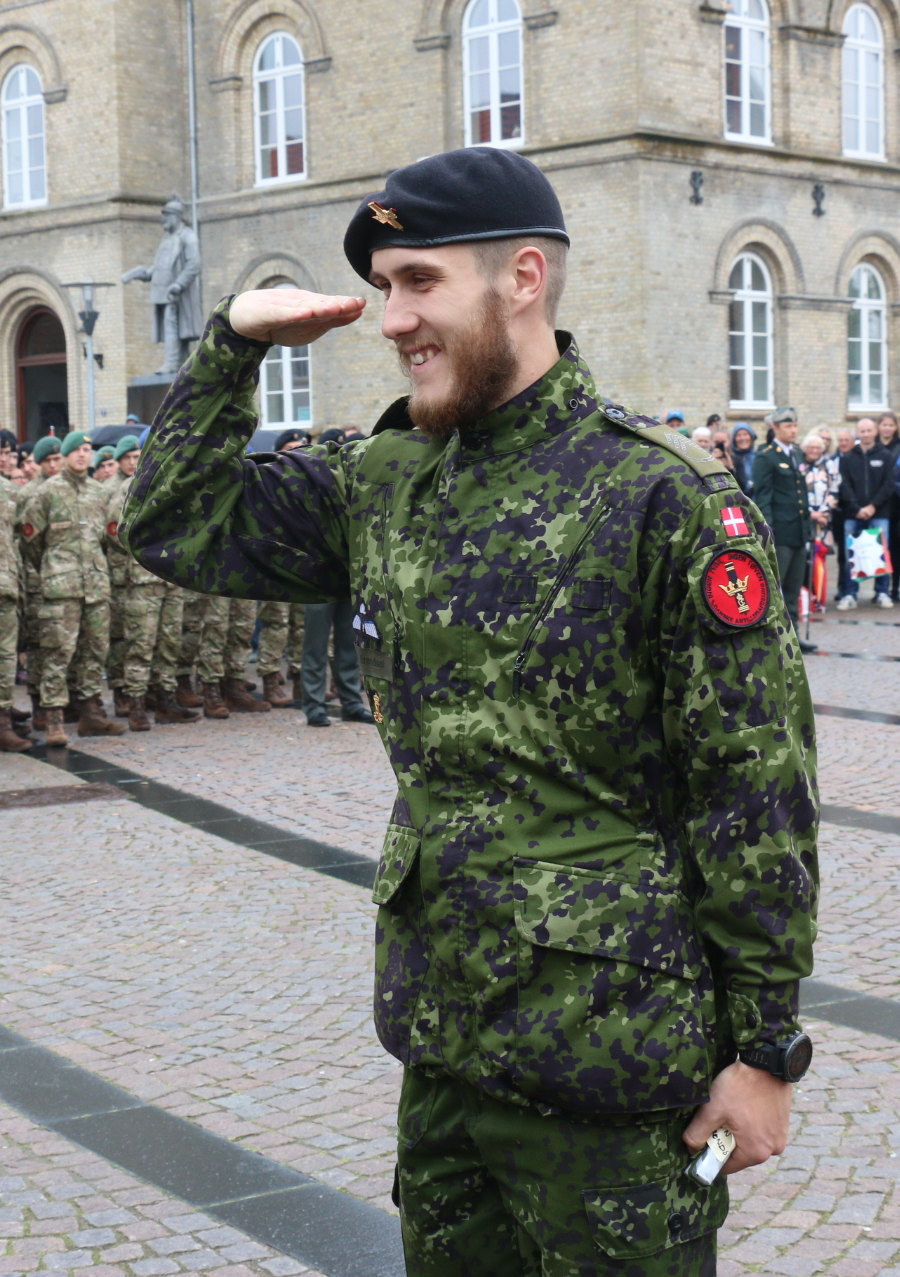
Danish Army Salute

In the Danish military, there are two types of military salutes. The first type is employed by the Royal Danish Navy and Guard Hussar Regiment Mounted Squadron, and is the same as the one used by the U.S. The second is employed by the Royal Danish Army and Royal Danish Air Force, and goes as follows: Raise the right arm forward, as to have upper arm 90 degrees from the body. Move the right hand to the temple, and have it parallel to the ground.

Hand salutes are not performed if a member is not wearing a headdress or if he is holding a weapon.

==== France ====
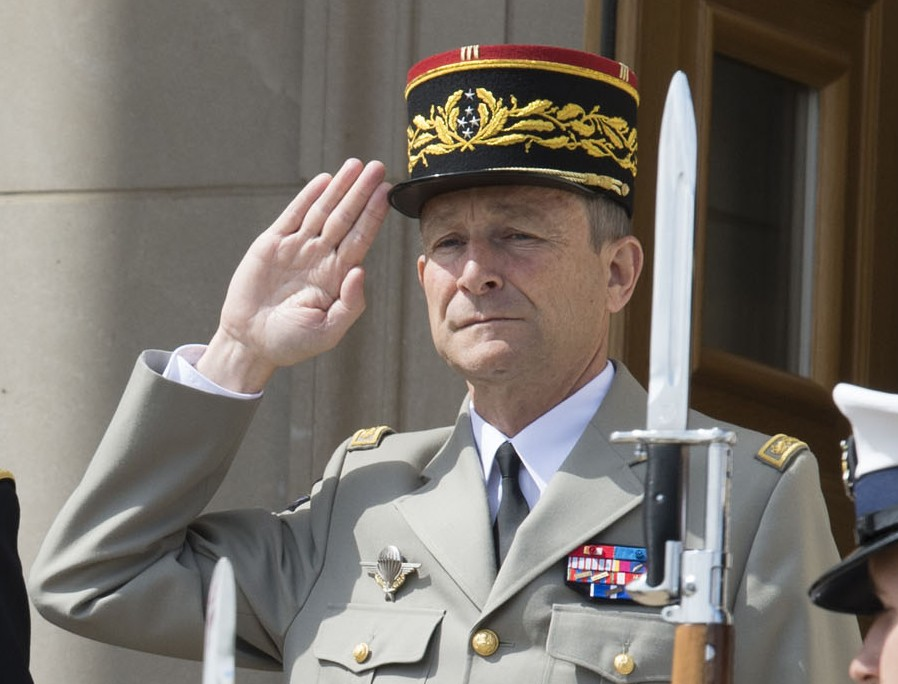
A French military salute by the French general Pierre de Villiers

Subordinates salute superiors and every salute is given back. Hand salutes are not performed if a member is not wearing a headdress or if he is holding a weapon.

The French salute is performed with a flat hand, palm facing forwards; the upper arm is horizontal and the tips of the fingers come near the corner of the eyes. The hand, unlike the British salute, remains at a 45-degree angle in line with the lower arm. The five fingers are lined together. It mirrors the gesture made by knights greeting each other, raising their visors to show their faces. A crisp tension may be given when the salute is taken or broken.

Some "creative" salutes are in use in certain mounted (cavalry) units. The fingers can be spread out with only the right thumb brushing the temple, or the hand can be cocked vertically along the cheek, with the little finger detached or not. These unusual regimental salutes are mannerisms which are lost during official ceremonies.

==== Germany ====
In the German Bundeswehr, the salute is performed with a flat hand, with the thumb resting on the index finger. The hand is slightly tilted to the front so that the thumb can not be seen. The upper arm is horizontal and the fingers point to the temple but do not touch it or the headgear. Every soldier saluting another uniformed soldier is entitled to be saluted in return. Soldiers below the rank of Feldwebel are not permitted to speak while saluting. Since the creation of the Bundeswehr, soldiers are required to salute with and without headgear. Originally, in the Reichswehr it was not permitted to perform the salute when the soldier is not wearing uniform headgear. In the Wehrmacht, the traditional military salute was required when wearing headgear, but the Nazi salute was performed when not wearing headgear. The Wehrmacht eventually fully adopted the Nazi salute following the 20 July Plot. East German National People's Army followed the Reichswehr protocol.

==== India ====
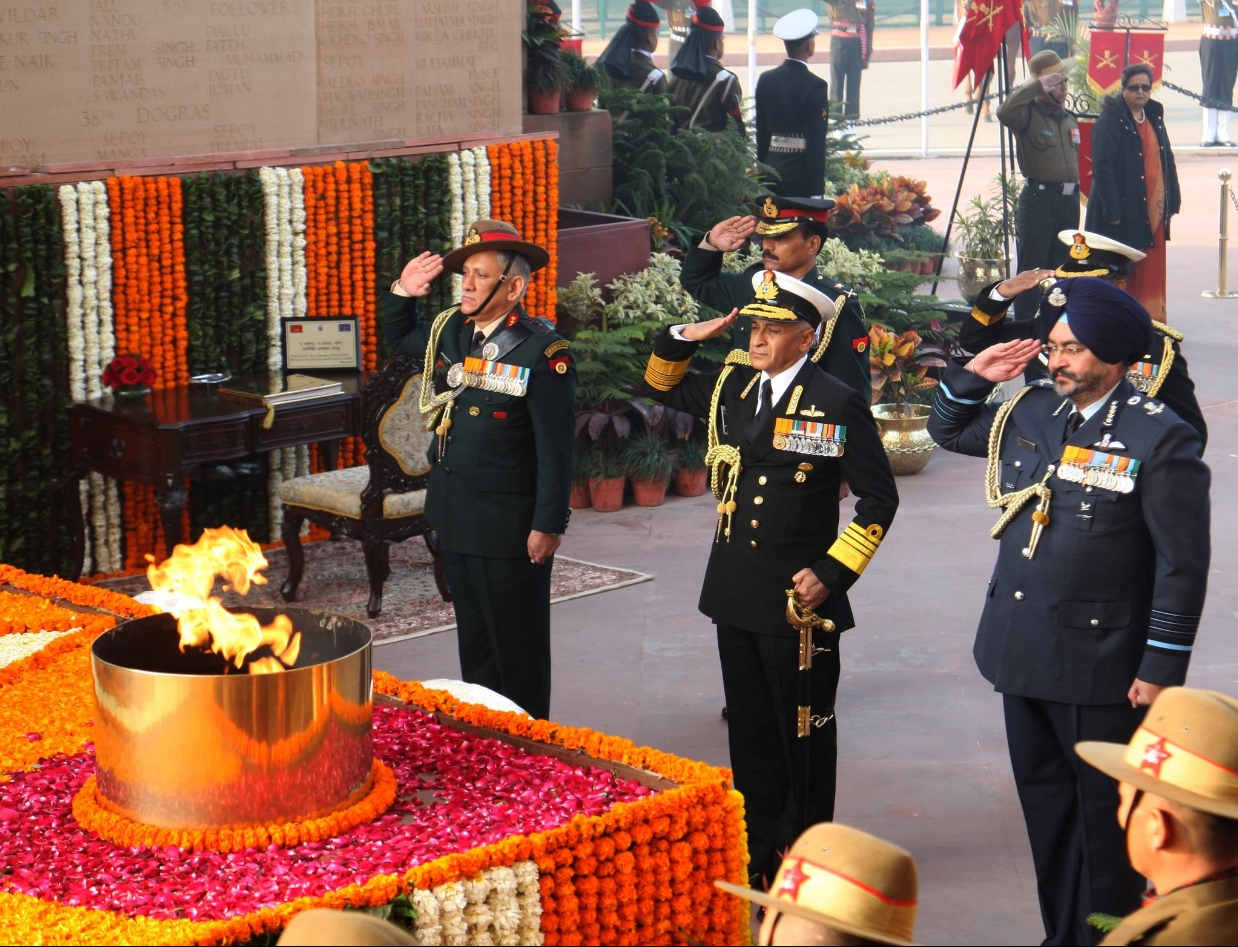
The former Chiefs of the Indian Army, Indian Navy and the Indian Air Force saluting at the Amar Jawan Jyoti. The three different salutes are shown.

In India, the three forces have different salutes with the Indian Army and the Indian Navy following the British tradition. In the Indian army, the salute is performed by keeping the open palm forward, with fingers and thumb together and middle finger almost touching the hatband or right eyebrow. This is often accompanied by the salutation "Jai Hind" which means long live India or Victory to India, or the regimental salutation, e.g. "Sat Sri Akal" in the Sikh Regiment. The Navy salute has the palm facing towards the ground at a 90-degree angle. The Indian Air Force salute involves the right arm being sharply raised from the front by the shortest possible way, with the plane of the palm at 45-degree angle to the forehead.

==== Indonesia ====
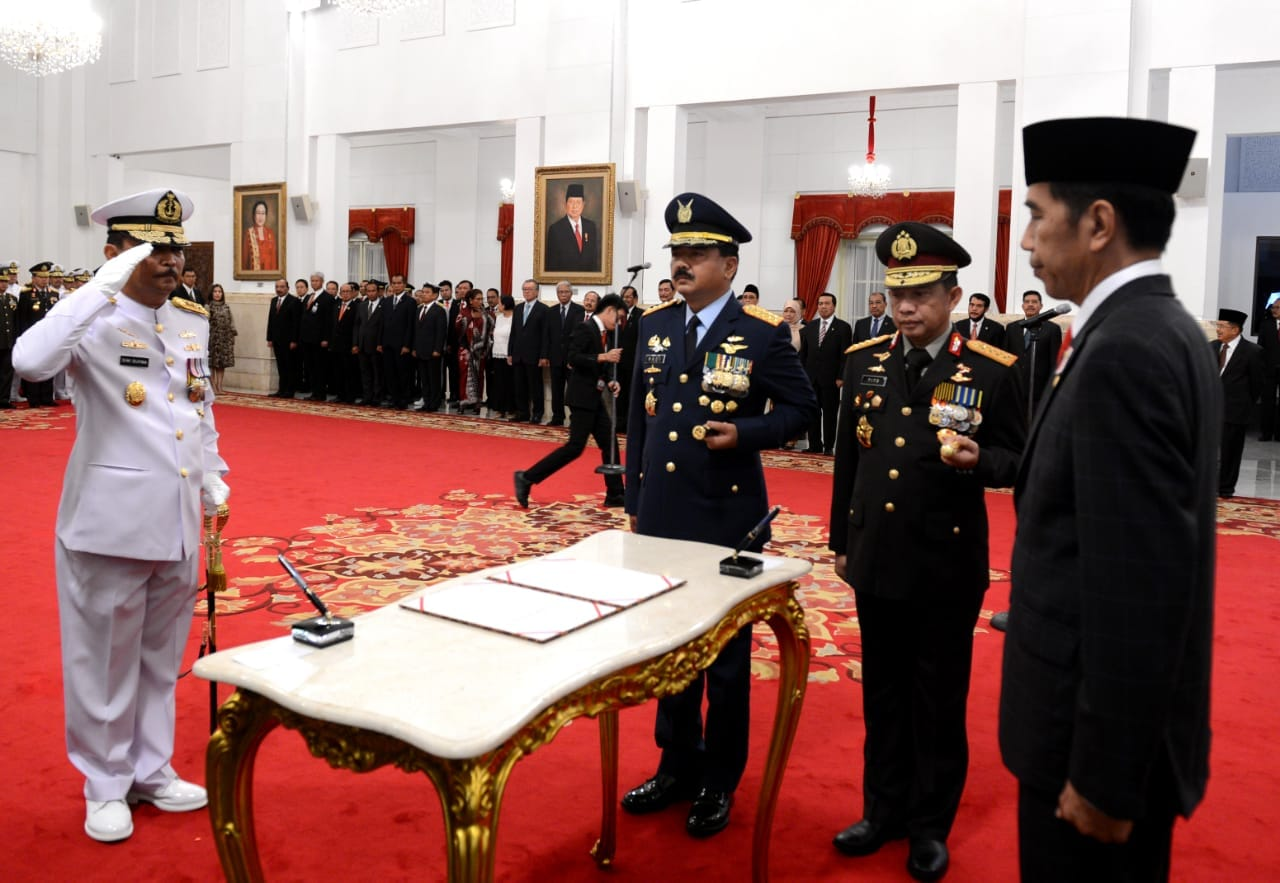
The Chief of Staff of the Indonesian Navy Admiral Siwi Sukma Adji salutes the President of Indonesia Joko Widodo.

In Indonesia, executing a salute has its regulations. Members who are part of a uniformed institution and wearing a uniform will implement a gesture of salute according to the regulations of the institution the member is part of. In this case, personnel of the TNI and Indonesian National Police are to implement a hand salute by forming the right hand up making an angle of 90 degrees and is bent 45 degrees, fingers are pressed together and placed near the temple of the right eye, palm facing down. Personnel wearing a headdress place the tip of the right index finger touching the front right tip of the headdress. Other uniformed organizations/institutions which are not part of the military/police will implement a hand salute as done by members of the military/police.

The command for this gesture in Indonesian is Hormat, Gerak!. Military and police personnel armed with a rifle during a ceremony will implement a present arms while personnel unarmed will execute the hand salute.

This is done during the raising and lowering of the national flag, rendition or singing of the national anthem, and when saluting a person or object worth saluting.

==== Italy ====
The hand salute is still performed according to the army "Infantry Training – Formal Instructions" regulation, chapter II, section 12 (1939) "The salute is completed sharply ... bringing the right hand vigorously to the visor of the headdress, with the tip of the fingers over the right eye; the hand in line with the forearm, with the palm facing downwards, the fingers joined and stretched, the index finger in contact with the edge of the visor; horizontal arm, forearm naturally inclined". The air force and navy use the same procedure, with the single exception of the navy boatswains that salute left-handed while giving the traditional "pipe aboard", as their right hand is used to hold the boatswain's call.

When given individually, the salute is given by inferior to superior ranks and is held until returned, and by word of command when given by a formed unit. For personnel not wearing hats, holding weapons or with otherwise encumbered hands, the salute is given by coming to attention. During marching armed parades only the officer in command salutes for the whole unit, briefly bringing the flat of his sword to his face if in full dress, or giving the standard hand salute if in combat uniform. During flag-rising and flag-lowering armed parades all officers and senior NCOs hand salute the flag, while other ranks present arms, and the whole unit sings the national anthem. Flag parties give salute by slightly inclining the flag only, with the flag-bearer and the escort not giving individual salutes.

==== Japan ====
In Japan, the angle of salute depends on the branch. In the Ground and the Air Self-Defense Forces, the salute is 90 degrees under the armpit like the U.S. Armed Forces. In the Maritime Self-Defense Forces, the salute is a 45-degree angle because of the narrowness of a ship's interior spaces. To prevent a member's elbow from hitting other members, subordinates may be given approval not to salute in a corridor inside the ship. Furthermore, in all the branches, if a member is not wearing their cap, then they should salute by bowing 10 degrees.

==== Pakistan ====
In Pakistan, the salute is generally identical to that of British armed forces. In the Army and Air Force, the salute is given with the right hand palm facing forward and fingers slightly touching the right side of the forehead, but not on the forehead. The Navy continues to salute palm down. The salute must be performed by the lower rank officials to the higher rank officials under all conditions except when the higher rank official is not in uniform or if the lower rank official is the driver and the vehicle is in motion. The salute is never performed by the left hand even if the right hand is occupied.

==== People's Republic of China ====
Military personnel of the People's Liberation Army salute palm-down, similar to the Royal Navy or US Military salutes.

==== Poland ====
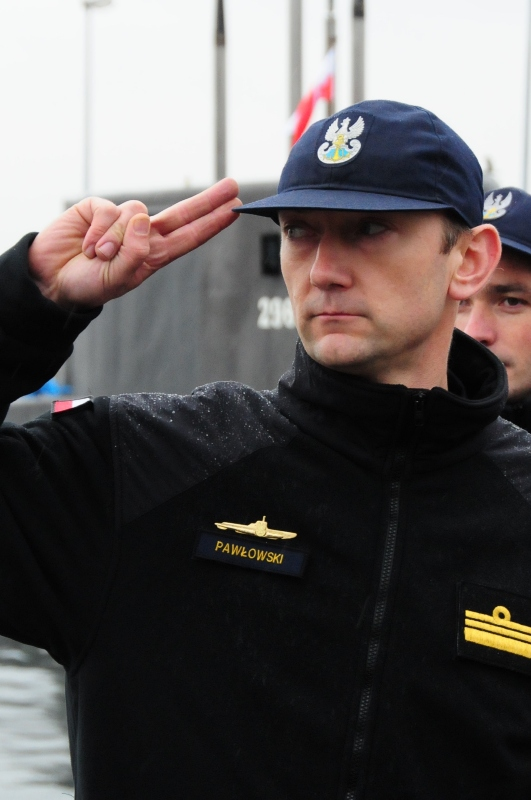
Polish-style salute, using two fingers

Polish military personnel use two fingers to salute, with the middle and index fingers extended and touching each other, while the ring and little fingers are bent and touched by the thumb. The salute is only used while wearing a headdress with the emblem of the Polish eagle (such as military hat rogatywka) or without this emblem (such as Boonie hat or helmet).

==== Sweden ====
Salutes are similar to those of the Royal Navy. The official instruction for stationary salute states: "The right hand is quickly raised straight up to the headgear. The fingers straight but not stiff next to each other, the little finger edge facing forward. One or two finger tips lightly resting against the right part of the headgear (visor), so that the hand does not obstruct the eye. The wrist straight, the elbow angled forward and slightly lower than the shoulder." Salutes to persons are normally not made when further away than 30 m. Hand salutes are performed only when carrying headgear, if bare headed (normally only indoors) a swift turning of the head towards the person that is being saluted is made instead. The same applies if the right hand is carrying any item that cannot easily be transferred to the left hand. During inspections and when on guard duty, the salute is made by coming to attention. Drivers of moving vehicles never salute. In formations, only the commander salutes.

==== Switzerland ====
Swiss soldiers are required to salute any higher-ranking military personnel whenever they encounter them. When the soldier announces to a higher-ranking person he has to state the superior's rank, his rank and his name. When a military formation encounters a superior, it has to state the name of the formation. The salute is given with the palm pointing towards the shoulder, the tips of the fingers pointing towards the temple.

==== Turkey ====
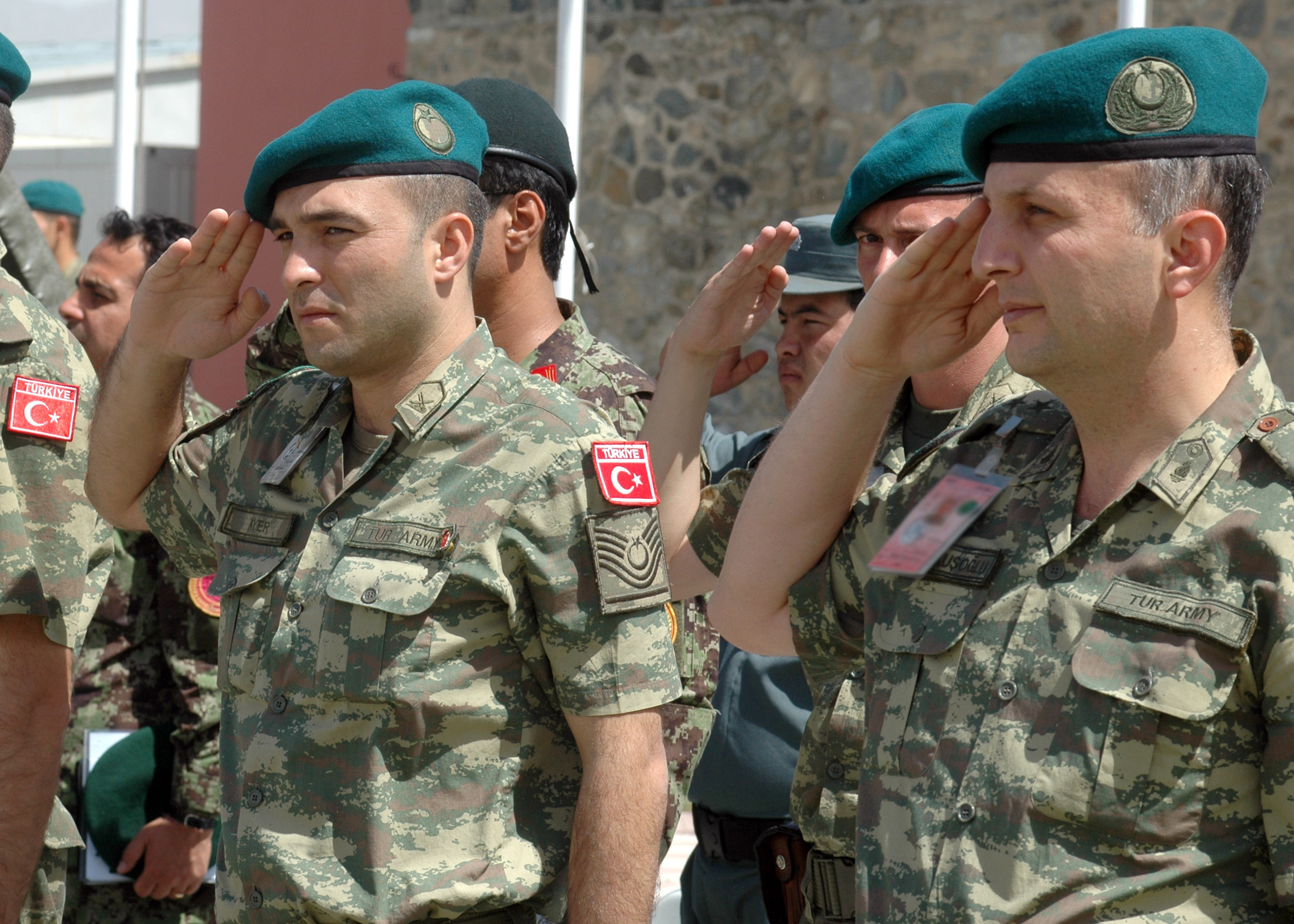
Turkish soldiers salute while the band plays the national anthem.

Within the Turkish military hand salutes are only given when a cover (protection for the head, usually a hat) is worn.

If the head is not covered or when the personnel is carrying a rifle on the shoulder the head salute is performed by nodding the head forward slightly while maintaining erect posture.

The salute (hand or head) must be performed first by the lower ranking personnel to the higher ranking personnel, and higher official is expected to return the salute, under all conditions except:

- Personnel who are driving vehicles.
- Personnel who are on sentry, patrol, observation duty or defending a specific point.
- Personnel on combat orders.
- Personnel who are transporting live ammunition.
- Military prisoners and personnel escorting them.

The casket of a soldier killed in the line of duty (irrespective of rank) has to be saluted by all ranks of personnel.

==== United Kingdom ====
===== British Army =====
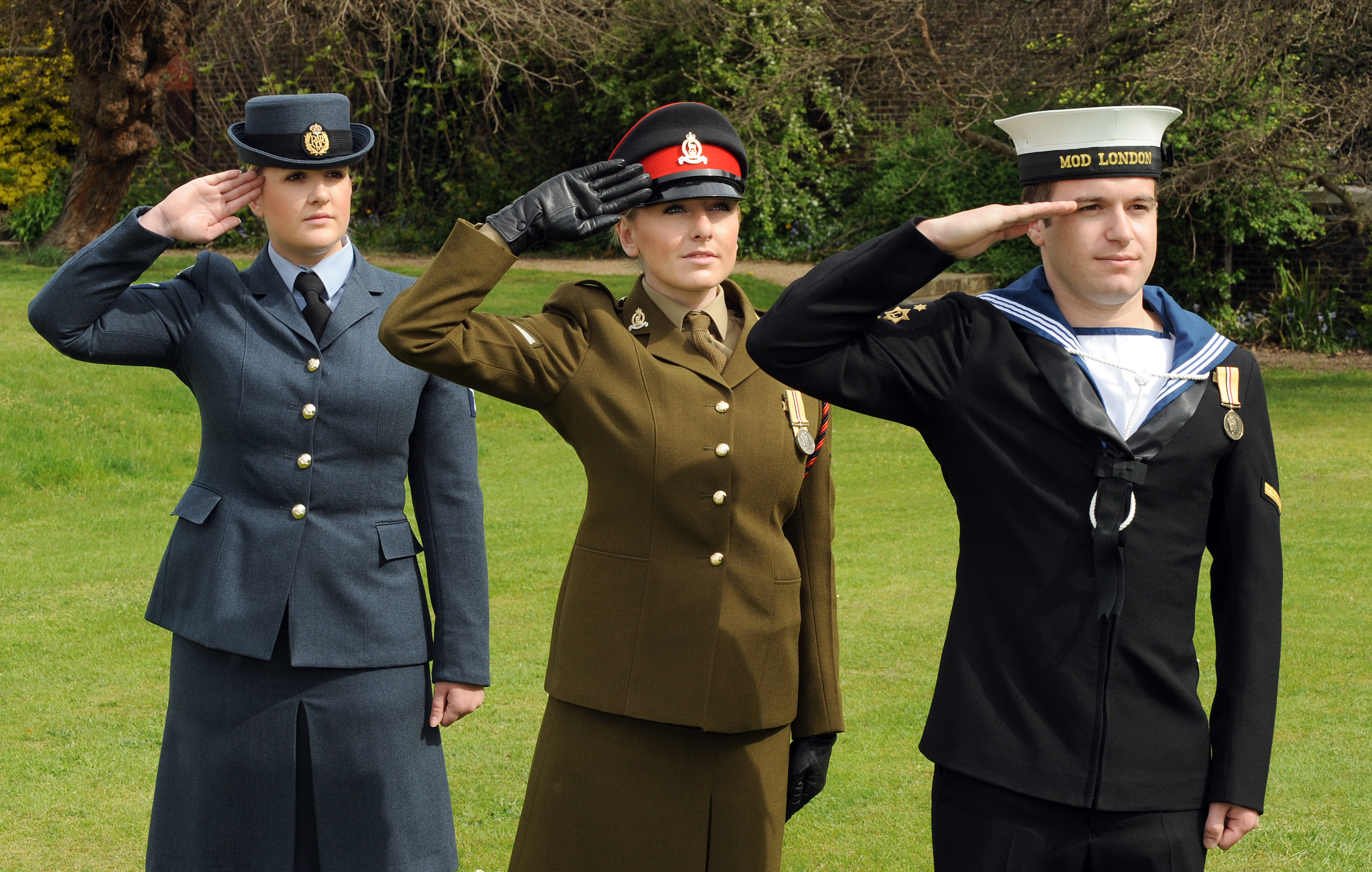
(Left to right): Royal Air Force palm facing out, behind right eye; British Army with palm facing out. fingers almost touching cap.; Royal Navy with the palm facing down

Since 1917, the British Army's salute has been given with the right hand palm facing forwards with the fingers almost touching the cap or beret. Before 1917, for Other Ranks (i.e. not officers) the salute was given with whichever hand was furthest from the person being saluted, whether that was the right or the left. Officers always saluted with the right hand (as the left, in theory, would always be required to hold the scabbard of their sword). The salute is given to acknowledge the King's commission. A salute may not be given unless a soldier is wearing his regimental headdress, for example a beret, caubeen, Tam o' Shanter, Glengarry, field service cap or peaked cap. This does not apply to members of The Blues and Royals (RHG/1stD) The Household Cavalry who, after the Battle of Warburg were allowed to salute without headdress. Soldiers or officers not wearing headdress must come to attention instead of giving/returning the salute. The subordinate salutes first and maintains the salute until the superior has responded in kind.

There is a widespread though erroneous belief that it is statutory for "all ranks to salute a bearer of the Victoria Cross". There is no official requirement that appears in the official Warrant of the VC, nor in King's Regulations and Orders, but tradition dictates that this occurs and as such the Chiefs of Staff will salute a Private awarded either a VC or George Cross.

===== Royal Air Force =====
The custom of saluting commissioned officers relates wholly to the commission given by the King to that officer, not the person. Therefore, when a subordinate airman salutes an officer, he is indirectly acknowledging the King as Head of State. A salute returned by the officer is on behalf of the King.

The RAF salute is similar to the British Army, the hand is brought upwards in a circular motion out from the body, it is stopped 1 inch (25 mm) to the rear and to the right of the right eye, the elbow and wrist are kept in line with the shoulder. The hand is then brought straight down back to the position of attention, this movement is completed to the timing "UP TWO-THREE CUT".

===== Royal Navy =====
The Naval salute differs in that the palm of the hand faces down towards the shoulder. This dates back to the days of sailing ships, when tar and pitch were used to seal a ship's timbers from seawater. To protect their hands, officers wore white gloves and it was considered most undignified to present a dirty palm in the salute, so the hand was turned through 90 degrees. A common story is that Queen Victoria, having been saluted by an individual with a dirty palm, decreed that in future sailors of the fleet would salute palm down, with the palm facing the ground.

====== Royal Marines ======
Though part of the Royal Navy, the Royal Marines salute in the style of the British Army, with the right hand palm facing forward.

===== British Empire =====
In the British Empire (originally in the maritime and hinterland sphere of influence of the East India Company, HEIC, later transformed into crown territories), mainly in British India, the numbers of guns fired as a gun salute to the ruler of a so-called princely state became a politically highly significant indicator of his status, not governed by objective rules, but awarded (and in various cases increased) by the British paramount power, roughly reflecting his state's socio-economic, political or military weight, but also as a prestigious reward for loyalty to the Raj, in classes (always odd numbers) from three to twenty-one (seven lacking), for the "vassal" indigenous rulers (normally hereditary with a throne, sometimes raised as a personal distinction for an individual ruling prince). Two sovereign monarchies officially outside the Empire were granted a higher honour: thirty-one guns for the royal houses of Afghanistan (under British and Russian influence), and Siam (which was then ruled by the Rattanakosin Kingdom).

In addition, the right to style himself Highness (Majesty, which since its Roman origin expresses the sovereign authority of the state, was denied to all "vassals"), a title of great importance in international relations, was formally restricted to rulers of relatively high salute ranks (originally only those with eleven guns or more, later also those with nine guns).

==== United States ====
===== U.S. Armed Forces =====
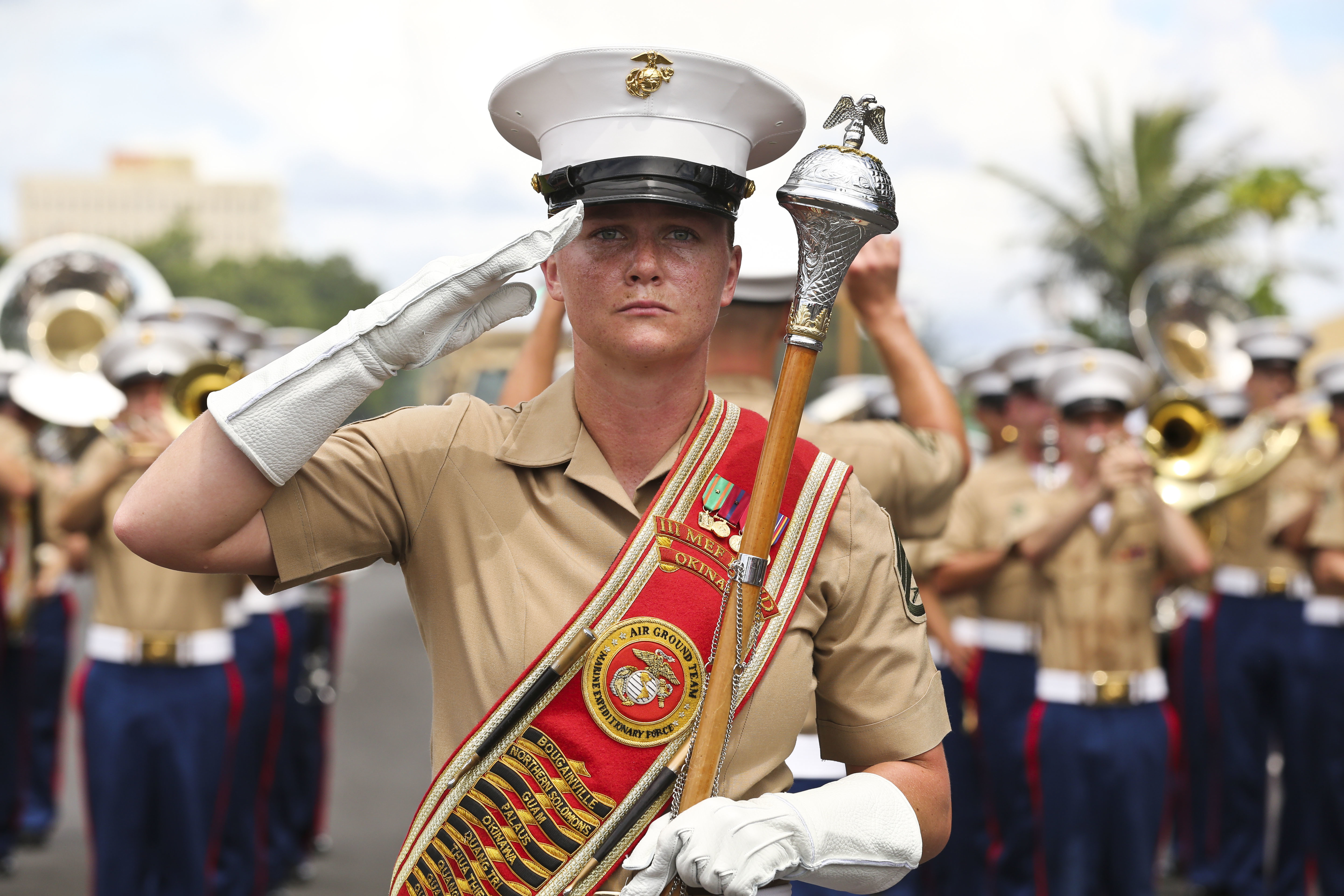
A United States Marine delivers a salute.

Within the United States military, the salute is a courteous exchange of greetings. With the junior member always saluting first. When returning or rendering an individual salute, the head and eyes are turned toward the colors or person saluted. Military personnel in uniform are required to salute when they meet and recognize persons entitled to a salute, except when it is inappropriate or impractical (in public conveyances such as planes and buses, in public places such as inside theaters, or when driving a vehicle).

Persons entitled to the salute include commissioned officers, warrant officers, the President of the United States, officers of friendly foreign nations, and recipients of the Medal of Honor (including enlisted personnel). Additionally, the flag of the United States is saluted during parades and other ceremonial functions.

The U.S. military's salute, while influenced by that of the British military, differs slightly in that the palm of the hand faces down towards the shoulder. This difference may date back to the days of sailing ships, when tar and pitch were used to seal the timber from seawater. During such times, it was considered undignified to present a dirty palm in the salute, so the hand was turned through 90 degrees.

Specifically, a proper salute goes as follows: Raise the right hand sharply, fingers and thumb extended and joined, palm facing down, and place the tip of the right forefinger on the rim of the visor, slightly to the right of the eye. The outer edge of the hand is barely canted downward so that neither the back of the hand nor the palm is clearly visible from the front. The hand and wrist are straight, the elbow inclined slightly forward, and the upper arm is horizontal.

Members of the United States Army, United States Air Force, and United States Space Force give salutes with heads both covered and uncovered, but saluting indoors is forbidden except when formally reporting to a superior officer or during an indoor ceremony. When outdoors, a head cover is to be worn at all times when wearing Army Combat Uniforms, but is not required when wearing physical training (PT) gear. The United States Navy, Marine Corps and Coast Guard do not salute when the head is uncovered or out of uniform.

===== US state defense forces =====
State defense forces (SDF) in the United States are military units that operate under the sole authority of a state government. State defense forces are authorized by state and federal law and are under the command of the governor of each state.

State defense forces are subject to their state military laws and regulations and render the same customs and courtesies as active duty, Reserve and National Guard personnel. They may also be subject to the Uniform Code of Military Justice where this is incorporated into state law, such as in California, or when the National Guard is federalized.

==== Zogist salute ====
The Zogist salute is a military salute that was instituted by Zog I of Albania. It is a gesture whereby the right hand is placed over the heart, with the palm facing downwards. It was first widely used by Zog's personal police force and was later adopted by the Royal Albanian Army.

In Mexico, a salute similar to the Zogist salute is rendered by Mexican civilians during the playing of the Mexican national anthem.

== Non-military services ==
=== Canada ===
Police services

The majority of police forces are taught to salute like the Canadian Armed Forces with a level palm and the middle finger aligned with the right eye, and not the brim of the hat.

The federal Royal Canadian Mounted Police salute according to the British Army tradition with the palm facing forward.

==== Non-police ====
Similar salutes are used by guards of honour for non-police services (e.g. Toronto Fire Services, Toronto Transit Commission, British Columbia Ambulance Service) during funerals or ceremonial events. Due to their close ties with the Canadian Armed Forces, the Royal Canadian Army Cadets, Royal Canadian Sea Cadets, and Royal Canadian Air Cadets are taught the Canadian Armed Forces salute.

=== Hong Kong ===
All uniform branches of the Hong Kong Police, Police Auxiliary, Police Pipeband, Fire (including Ambulance service members), Immigration, Customs, Correctional Services, Government Flying Service, Civil Aid Service) saluted according to British Army traditions until 2021. Personnel stationed with the People's Liberation Army in Hong Kong salute using the Chinese military standards and similar to those used by the Royal Navy.

Non-government organizations like Hong Kong Air Cadet Corps, Hong Kong Adventure Corps, the Boys' Brigade, Hong Kong, Hong Kong Sea Cadet Corps, Hong Kong Scout and St. John Ambulance all follow the same military salutes due to their ties with the British Armed Forces.

== Civilian military auxiliaries (U.S.) ==
=== Civil Air Patrol ===
In the United States, civilian military auxiliaries such as the Civil Air Patrol are required to salute all commissioned and warrant officers of higher rank and return the salute of those with lower ranks of the U.S. Uniformed Services (Army, Marine Corps, Navy, Air Force, Space Force, Coast Guard, PHS Commissioned Corps, NOAA Commissioned Officer Corps) senior in rank to them, as well as all friendly foreign officers, though military members are not required to reciprocate. CAP officers are required to salute one another though this is not uniformly observed throughout the CAP. Cadets are required to salute all CAP Senior Members and all commissioned and warrant officers of military/uniformed services.

=== U.S. Coast Guard Auxiliary ===
The U.S. Coast Guard Auxiliary requires its members to salute all commissioned and warrant officers of higher rank and return the salute of those with lower ranks; since auxiliarists hold "office" rather than "grade" (indicated by modified military insignia), all auxiliarists are required to perform this courtesy. Saluting between auxiliarists is not usually the custom, but is not out of protocol to do so.

== Civilian salutes ==
In most countries, civilians have their own form of salutes.

=== Adaab ===
In South Asia, the adaab is commonly used as an inclusive, multi-faith greeting involving raising the right hand in front of the eyes with the palm inwards, whilst the upper torso is bent forward. The gesture is commonly associated with Ganga-Jamuni tehzeeb culture and often acts as a symbol of Hindu-Muslim unity.

=== Airline industry ===
In most airlines' standard operating procedures, the ground crew that handles the departure of an aircraft from a gate are required to salute the captain before the aircraft is released for taxi, which is normally returned by the captain. The practice originated from the same ground ceremony found in military aviation.

=== Clenched fist salute ===
The raised clenched fist, symbolizing unity in struggle, was popularized in the 19th century by the socialist, communist and anarchist movements, and is still used today by some people.

In the United States, the raised fist was associated with the Black Power movement, symbolized in the 1968 Olympics Black Power salute; a clenched-fist salute is also proper in many African nations, including South Africa.

=== Indonesia ===
In Indonesia, executing a salute is regulated for civilians according to the Constitution of Indonesia. Civilians in civilian clothing, officially, are expected to stand upright, straighten their arms down, and clench their palms with the thumbs facing forward against the thighs with a straight ahead gaze, however hand saluting in the case of performances of the National Anthem aside from flag ceremonies is encouraged. Members of a uniformed organization/institution not part of the military or police such as fire fighters, traffic wardens, municipal policemen, immigration officers, customs officers, Search and Rescue personnel, scouts, school students, etc. in uniform will implement a salute as done by members of the military and police.

This is done during the raising and lowering of the national flag, rendition or singing of the national anthem, and when saluting a person or object worth saluting.

=== Latin America ===
In Latin America, except in Mexico, a salute similar to the United States flag salute is used, with the hand over the heart.

=== Marching bands and Drum and Bugle Corps ===
Hand salutes similar to those used in the military are often rendered by the Drum Major of a marching band or drum corps just prior to beginning their performance and following completion of the performance. In all cases, the salute is rendered to the audience.

The classic "corps style" salute is often known as the "punch" type, where the saluting party will first punch their right arm straight forward from their body, arm parallel to the ground, hand in a fist, followed by the more traditional salute position with the right hand, left arm akimbo. Dropping the salute typically entails snapping the saluting hand to the side and clenching the fist, then dropping both arms to the sides.

In the US, a Drum Major carrying a large baton or mace will often salute by bringing the right hand to the left shoulder, holding the mace with the head upward,

There are occasional, more flamboyant variations, such as the windmill action of the saluting arm given by the Madison Scouts drum major, or the running of the saluting hand around the brim of the hat worn by the Cavaliers drum major.

=== One-finger salute ===
In Islam raising the index finger signifies the Tawhīd (تَوْحِيد), which denotes the indivisible oneness of God. It is used to express the unity of God ("There is no god but God").

In Arabic, the index or fore finger is called musabbiḥa (مُسَبِّحة), mostly used with the definite article: al-musabbiḥa (الْمُسَبِّحة). Sometimes also as-sabbāḥa (السَّبّاحة) is used. The Arabic verb سَبَّحَ (sabbaḥa), which has the same root as the Arabic word for index finger, means to praise or glorify God by saying: "Subḥāna Allāh" (سُبْحانَ الله).

=== Philippines ===
In the Philippines, civilians salute the national flag during flag raising and upon hearing the Philippine National Anthem by standing at attention and doing the same hand-to-heart salute as their American, Italian, Nigerian, and South African counterparts. People wearing hats or caps must bare their heads and hold the headwear over their heart (excepting religious headwear). Those in the military or in security, as well as Boy Scouts of the Philippines, Girl Scouts of the Philippines, and sometimes ship or airline pilots, all perform traditional military salutes if they are in uniform and on duty; off-duty personnel do the hand-to-heart salutes. During the Martial Law years from 1972 to 1981 up to the 1986 EDSA Revolution, the "raised clenched fist" salute was done during the singing and playing of the National Anthem by some political and protest groups, especially opposition parties and activists.

People whose religious beliefs prohibit them from singing the anthem or reciting the patriotic pledge (such as Jehovah's Witnesses) are exempted from salutes but are still required to show full respect when the anthem is being sung or played by standing at attention and not engaging in disruptive activities.

=== Roman salute ===
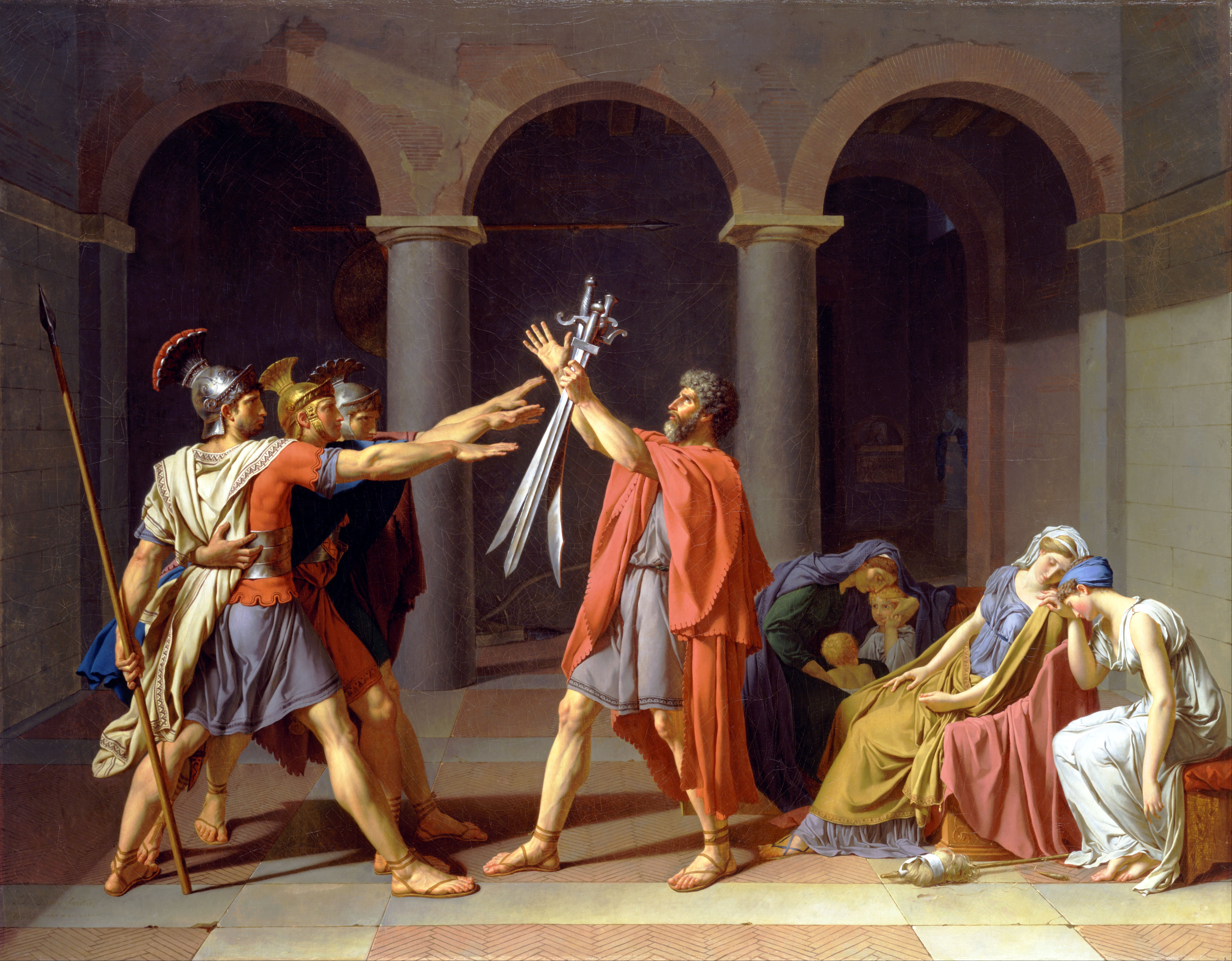
The Oath of the Horatii, by Jacques-Louis David

The Roman salute is a gesture in which the arm is held out forward straight, with palm down and fingers extended straight and touching. Sometimes the arm is raised upward at an angle, sometimes it is held out parallel to the ground. A well known symbol of Fascism, it is commonly perceived to be based on a classical Roman custom.^{p. 2} but no known Roman work of art displays this salute, and no known Roman text describes it.

Beginning with Jacques-Louis David's painting The Oath of the Horatii (1784), an association of the gesture with Roman republican and imperial culture emerged through 18th-century French art. The association with ancient Roman traditions was further developed in France during the Napoleonic era and again in popular culture through late 19th- and early 20th-century plays and films. These include the epic Cabiria (1914), whose screenplay was attributed to Italian nationalist Gabriele d'Annunzio. In a case of life imitating art, d'Annunzio appropriated the salute as a neo-imperial ritual when he led the occupation of Fiume in 1919. It was soon adopted by the Italian Fascist party, whose use of the salute inspired the Nazi party salute. However, the armed forces (Wehrmacht) of the Third Reich used a German form of the military salute until, in the wake of the July 20 plot on Hitler's life in 1944, the Nazi salute or Hitlergruss was imposed on them.

Other salutes derived from the Roman salute include the Olympic salute, used by athletes at the Olympic Games, and the Bellamy salute, used by civilians in the United States to salute the American flag. Both salutes fell out of use during WWII.

In Germany showing the Roman salute is today prohibited by law. Those rendering similar salutes, for example raising the left instead of the right hand, or raising only three fingers, are liable to prosecution. The punishment derives from § 86a of the German Criminal Code and can be up to three years imprisonment or a fine (in minor cases).

In Mexico, the Roman salute is still used during the Saludo a la Bandera (salute to the flag) and is even depicted on the 100 peso bill released to celebrate the 100th anniversary of the constitution.

=== Scouting ===
Boy Scouts and Girl Scouts meanwhile have their own form of salutes, which generally involve the right hand brought to either just above the right eye or to the right shoulder, with the thumb holding down the smallest finger and palm facing outwards. A variation with only two fingers is sometimes used for Cub scouts.

=== Thailand ===
Thailand has a "Flag Code" that determines how the flag should be displayed and respected. Section 7 of the "Flag Code" mandates that, upon seeing the raising or lowering of the flag at 08:00 and 18:00, general civilians should stand at attention and face the flag. In cases where only the National Anthem is heard, or one is in a vehicle, one should come to a complete stop until the National Anthem ends. Uniformed government employees are further governed by their own regulations which define whether to salute the Flag while in formation for the enlisted and the officers. The laws themselves do not specify punishment for not respecting or saluting the flag, only for using illegal flags.

In addition to the National Anthem, the Royal Anthem Sansoen Phra Barami is also given a similar respect. The laws regarding lèse majesté in Thailand do not contain punishment for merely refusing to stand or otherwise ignoring the Royal Anthem as it is not a direct threat against the royalty; it is, however, a serious criminal offense to make offensive gestures.

=== United Kingdom ===
In the United Kingdom, certain civilians, such as officers of HM Revenue and Customs, salute the quarterdeck of Royal Navy vessels on boarding.

=== United States ===
In the United States, civilians may salute the national flag by placing their right hand over their heart or by standing at attention during the playing of the national anthem or while reciting the U.S. Pledge of Allegiance, or when the flag is passing by, as in a parade. Men and boys remove their hats and other headgear during the salute; religious headdress (and military headdress worn by veterans in uniform, who are otherwise civilians) are exempt. The nature of the headgear determines whether it is held in the left or right hand, tucked under the left arm, etc. However, if it is held in the right hand, the headgear is not held over the heart but the hand is placed in the same position it would be if it were not holding anything.

The Defense Authorization Act of 2009, signed by President Bush, contained a provision that gave veterans and active-duty service members not in uniform the right to salute during the playing of the national anthem. Previous legislation authorized saluting when not in uniform during the raising, lowering and passing of the flag. However, because a salute is a form of communication protected by the Free Speech clause of the First Amendment, legislative authorization is not technically required for any civilian—veteran or non-veteran—to salute the U.S. flag. Whatever the legal status, to salute wrongly is disapproved by veterans' organizations. Civilians in some other countries, like Italy, South Africa, Afghanistan, Bosnia and Herzegovina, South Korea, Croatia, Poland, Kazakhstan, and Nigeria also render the same civilian salute as their U.S. counterparts when hearing their respective national anthems.

== See also ==
- Feu de joie
- Noon-day Gun
- Quenelle (gesture)
- Three-finger salute (scouts)
- Water salute
- Wave (gesture)
