= Ade Supandi =

Former Indonesian admiral

Admiral (Ret.) Ade Supandi
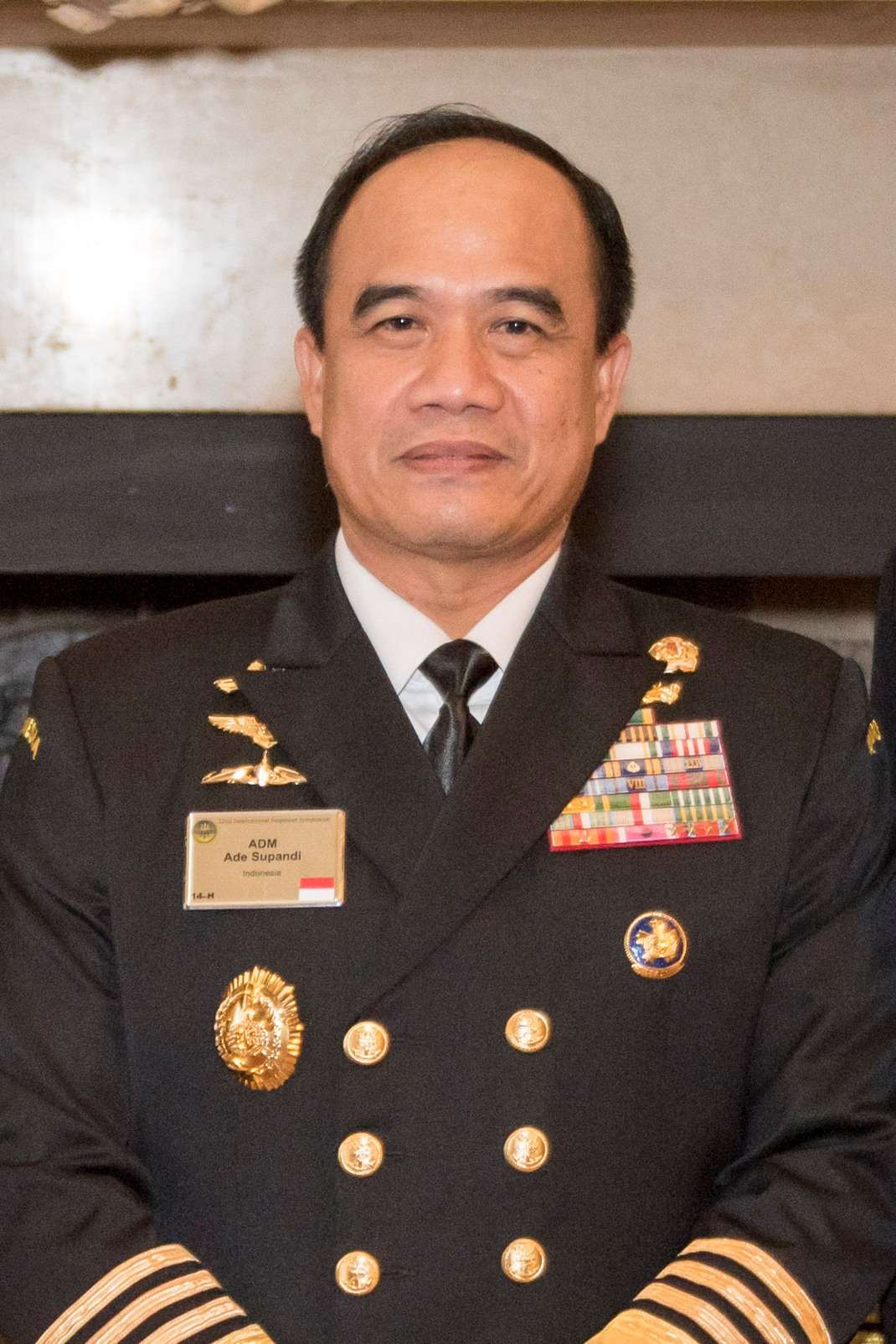
- Born: 26 May 1960 (age 66); Bandung, West Java, Indonesia
- Military career
- Allegiance: Indonesia
- Branch: Indonesian Navy
- Service years: 1983–2018
- Rank: Admiral
- Commands: Chief of Staff of Indonesian Navy; General Chief of Staff of TNI; Commander of Eastern Fleet

Ade Supandi (born 26 May 1960) is a retired admiral in the Indonesian Navy who formerly served as its chief of staff (Indonesian: Kepala Staf Angkatan Laut, abbreviated KSAL or Kasal). Previously, he had been the General Chief of Staff of the Indonesian National Armed Forces and the commander of the navy's eastern fleet.

== Career ==
Ade graduated from the Indonesian Naval Academy in 1983. He passed through multiple positions, including the governor of the Naval Academy in 2010 and commander of the Eastern Fleet Command before being appointed to the post of the KSAL's budgeting and planning assistant. He was transferred to be TNI's General Chief of Staff on 12 March 2014, before being appointed by Joko Widodo as KSAL on 31 December. He was promoted to the rank of admiral on 3 February 2015.

After his retirement, he was replaced by Siwi Sukma Adji on 22 May 2018. He remarked that he "was not yet interested" in entering politics.

== Honours ==

Star of Mahaputera, 3rd Class (Bintang Mahaputera Utama) (2020)	Military Distinguished Service Star (Bintang Dharma)	Navy Meritorious Service Star, 1st Class (Bintang Jalasena Utama)	Army Meritorious Service Star, 1st Class (Bintang Kartika Eka Pakçi Utama)
Air Force Meritorius Service Star, 1st Class (Bintang Swa Bhuwana Paksa Utama)	National Police Meritorious Service Star, 1st Class (Bintang Bhayangkara Utama) (2016)	Grand Meritorious Military Order Star, 2nd Class (Bintang Yudha Dharma Pratama) (21 March 2014)	Navy Meritorious Service Star, 2nd Class (Bintang Jalasena Pratama)
Grand Meritorious Military Order Star, 3rd Class (Bintang Yudha Dharma Nararya)	Navy Meritorious Service Star, 3rd Class (Bintang Jalasena Nararya)	Military Long Service Medal, 32 Years (Satyalancana Kesetiaan 32 Tahun)	Medal for Active Duty in the Navy (Satyalancana Dharma Samudra)
Military Long Service Medal, 24 Years (Satyalancana Kesetiaan 24 Tahun)	Military Long Service Medal, 16 Years (Satyalancana Kesetiaan 16 Tahun)	Military Long Service Medal, 8 Years (Satyalancana Kesetiaan 8 Tahun)	Military Operation Service Medal VII in Aceh (Satyalancana Gerakan Operasi Militer ("GOM") VII)
Military Instructor Service Medals (Satyalancana Dwidya Sistha)	Medal for Active Duty in Indonesia's Outer Islands (Satyalancana Wira Nusa)	Medal for National Defense Service (Satyalancana Dharma Nusa)	Medal for Active Duty as a Border Guard (Satyalancana Wira Dharma)
Medal for Active International Military Duty (Satyalancana Santi Dharma)	Badge of Melati - The Pramuka Movement of Indonesia	Medal for Providing an Example of Meritorious Personality (Satyalancana Wira Karya)	Social Welfare Medal (Satyalancana Kebaktian Sosial)
Order of National Security Merit - 1st Class (Tongil Medal) - South Korea (27 March 2016)	Courageous Commander of the Most Gallant Order of Military Service (Pingat Panglima Gagah Angkatan Tentera) - Malaysia (19 April 2016)	Tamandaré Merit Medal - Brazil (19 May 2017)	Meritorious Service Medal (Military) (Pingat Jasa Gemilang) (Tentera) - Singapore (24 November 2017)

== See also ==
- Indonesian military ranks
- Mulyono, army chief of staff

Military offices
Preceded by Marsetio	Chief of Staff of the Indonesian Navy; 31 December 2014 − 23 May 2018	Succeeded by Siwi Sukma Adji
