= Ground ceremony =

The Ground Ceremony is a ritual used in some air forces, for example the United States Air Force, signifying the handing off of the aircraft by the chief ground mechanic to the pilot, where the pilot is assured his aircraft is ready and safe for flight. The main goal of the customary "ceremony" is to reinforce teamwork and spirit between the pilot and maintenance crew.

== Ground Ceremony ==
The ritual (in its US version) includes the following four steps:

- The first salute is a courtesy greeting that signifies respect between the aircraft mechanic and his pilot.
- The handshake takes the greeting to a new level and is the personal bond between the mechanic and his pilot.
- The second salute after the pilot has operationally checked the aircraft signifies the aircraft's airworthiness and that the aircraft is now in the hands of the pilot.
- The thumbs-up is the personal gesture wishing a good flight to the pilot.
