= Siwi Sukma Adji =

Indonesian Navy admiral

Admiral (Ret.) Siwi Sukma Adji
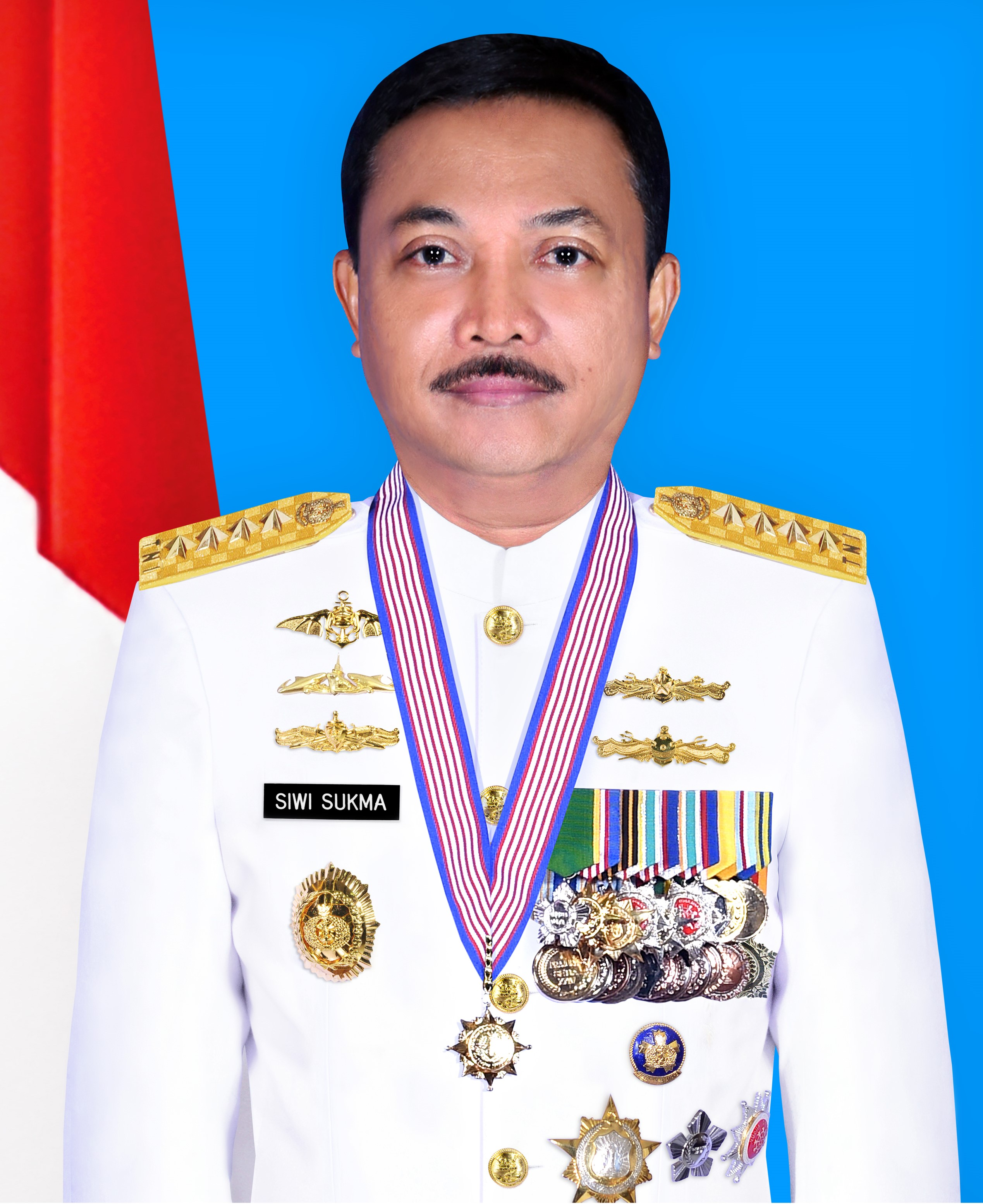
- Born: 14 May 1962 (age 64); Cimahi, West Java, Indonesia
- Military career
- Allegiance: Indonesia
- Branch: Indonesian Navy
- Service years: 1985–2020
- Rank: Admiral
- Commands: Chief of Staff of Indonesian Navy; Commander-general of Armed Forces Academy; Commander of Western Fleet

Admiral (Ret.) Siwi Sukma Adji (born 14 May 1962) is a retired admiral of the Indonesian Navy who had served as its chief of staff (Indonesian: Kepala Staf Angkatan Laut, abbreviated KSAL or Kasal) since 23 May 2018 until 20 May 2020, replacing Ade Supandi who was retiring.

Before becoming chief of staff, he had served as the commander-general of the National Armed Forces Academy, Advisor for General Planning in TNI HQ, and commander of the western fleet.

== Education ==
Born in Cimahi, West Java on 14 May 1962, he underwent normal civilian education and finishing his high school studies on 1981. He joined the Indonesian Naval Academy, graduating in 1985 as part of its 30th cohort. Later on, he also obtained a bachelor's degree in economics (2013) and a master's degree in human resources management (2016).

== Career ==
After graduating from the academy, he began his service on the Van Speijk-class frigate KRI Oswald Siahaan (354). There, he was a gunnery officer. He then moved on, serving as a Chief of Operations on KRI Untung Surapati (372) and executive officer on KRI Teluk Sampit (515). He received the post of commander later on, starting out as commander of a Kondor-class minesweeper and later the Parchim-class corvette KRI Sultan Thaha Syaifuddin (376) and the Fatahillah-class frigate KRI Nala (363).

After the warship commands, he served as operations assistant of the Western Fleet command until March 2010, when he was a colonel. He also later held the positions of the commander of the Eastern Fleet Command's naval defense cluster (2011) and deputy planning assistant for the navy chief of staff. In August 2013, he held the rank of commodore (Indonesian: Laksamana Pertama) and was appointed as the chief of staff for the Eastern Fleet Command. In July 2014, he was promoted to rear admiral (Indonesian: Laksamana Muda). He became the commander of the Western Fleet Command on 19 July 2016, replacing Achmad Taufiqoerrachman who was in his naval academy class.

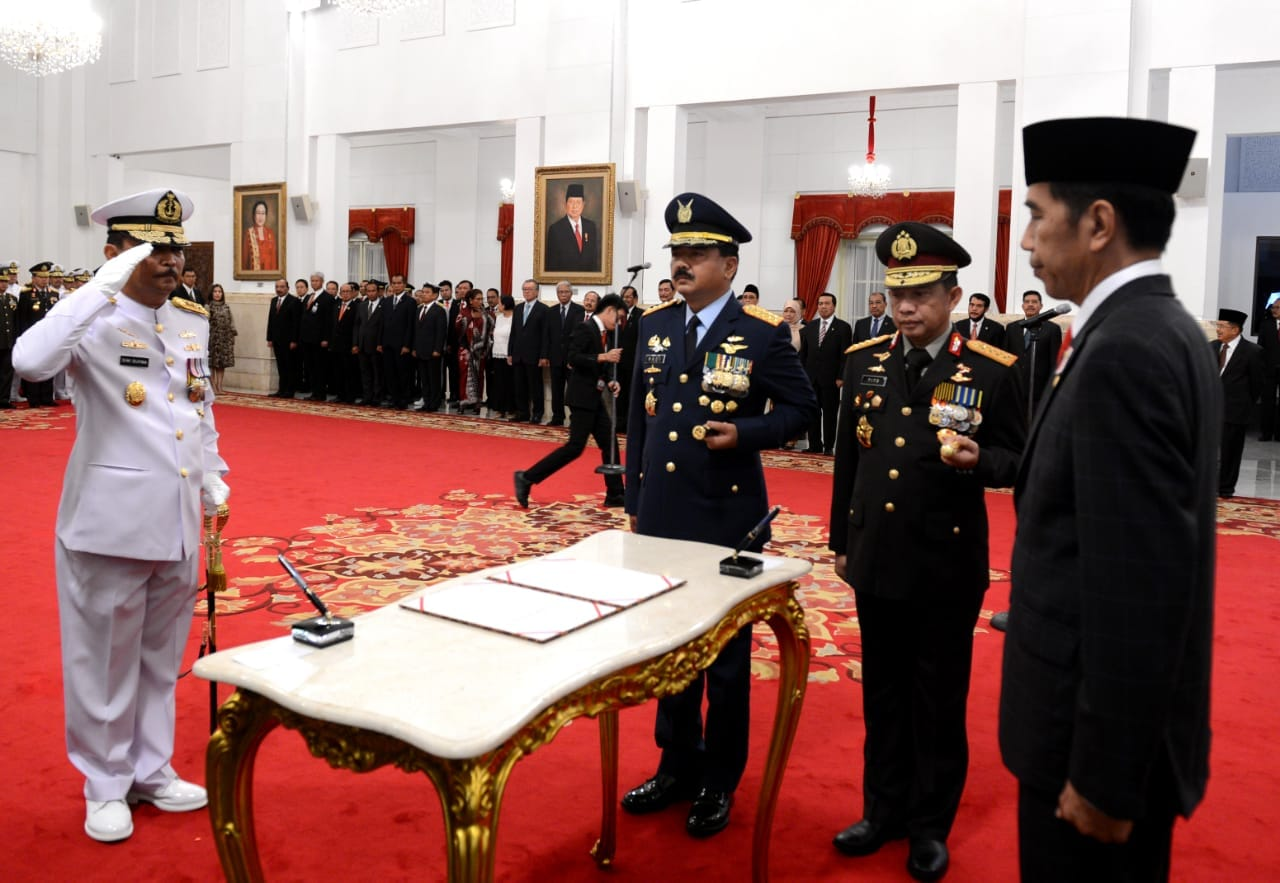
Siwi saluting Joko Widodo during the former's inauguration.

On 29 September 2017, he was appointed to become the commander-general of the armed forces academy (Indonesian: Akademi TNI). In December the same year, he received a promotion making him a vice admiral (Indonesian: Laksamana Madya).

=== Chief of staff ===
In late January 2018, then-navy chief of staff Ade Supandi brought him forward alongside four others as possible candidates to replace him, as he was planning to retire by June. After armed forces commander Hadi Tjahjanto brought the five names forward to president Joko Widodo, the latter picked Siwi. Officially appointed through presidential decree 43/TNI/2018, he was sworn in on 23 May in Istana Negara. He was the 26th chief of staff in the body's history. Following his appointment, his rank was elevated to a four-star admiral (Indonesian: Laksamana).

== Honours ==

Star of Mahaputera, 3rd Class (Bintang Mahaputera Utama) (2020)	Military Distinguished Service Star (Bintang Dharma) (2018)	Navy Meritorious Service Star, 1st Class (Bintang Jalasena Utama) (19 June 2013)	Army Meritorious Service Star, 1st Class (Bintang Kartika Eka Pakçi Utama) (2019)
Air Force Meritorius Service Star, 1st Class (Bintang Swa Bhuwana Paksa Utama) (2019)	National Police Meritorious Service Star, 1st Class (Bintang Bhayangkara Utama) (2018)	Grand Meritorious Military Order Star, 2nd Class (Bintang Yudha Dharma Pratama) (20 January 2016)	Navy Meritorious Service Star, 2nd Class (Bintang Jalasena Pratama)
Grand Meritorious Military Order Star, 3rd Class (Bintang Yudha Dharma Nararya)	Navy Meritorious Service Star, 3rd Class (Bintang Jalasena Nararya)	Wounds Medal (Satyalancana Bhakti)	Military Long Service Medal, 32 Years (Satyalancana Kesetiaan 32 Tahun)
Medal for Active Duty in the Navy (Satyalancana Dharma Samudra)	Military Long Service Medal, 24 Years (Satyalancana Kesetiaan 24 Tahun)	Military Long Service Medal, 16 Years (Satyalancana Kesetiaan 16 Tahun)	Military Long Service Medal, 8 Years (Satyalancana Kesetiaan 8 Tahun)
Military Operation Service Medal VII in Aceh (Satyalancana Gerakan Operasi Militer ("GOM") VII)	Military Instructor Service Medals (Satyalancana Dwidya Sistha)	Medal for National Defense Service (Satyalancana Dharma Nusa)	Medal for Active Duty as a Border Guard (Satyalancana Wira Dharma)
Medal for Active International Military Duty (Satyalancana Santi Dharma)	Medal for Providing an Example of Meritorious Personality (Satyalancana Wira Karya)	Social Welfare Medal (Satyalancana Kebaktian Sosial)	Badge of Melati - The Pramuka Movement of Indonesia

Military offices
Preceded by Ade Supandi	Chief of Staff of the Indonesian Navy; 23 May 2018-20 May 2020	Succeeded by Yudo Margono
