= Mosaics of Delos =

Ancient Greek mosaic art from Delos, Crete

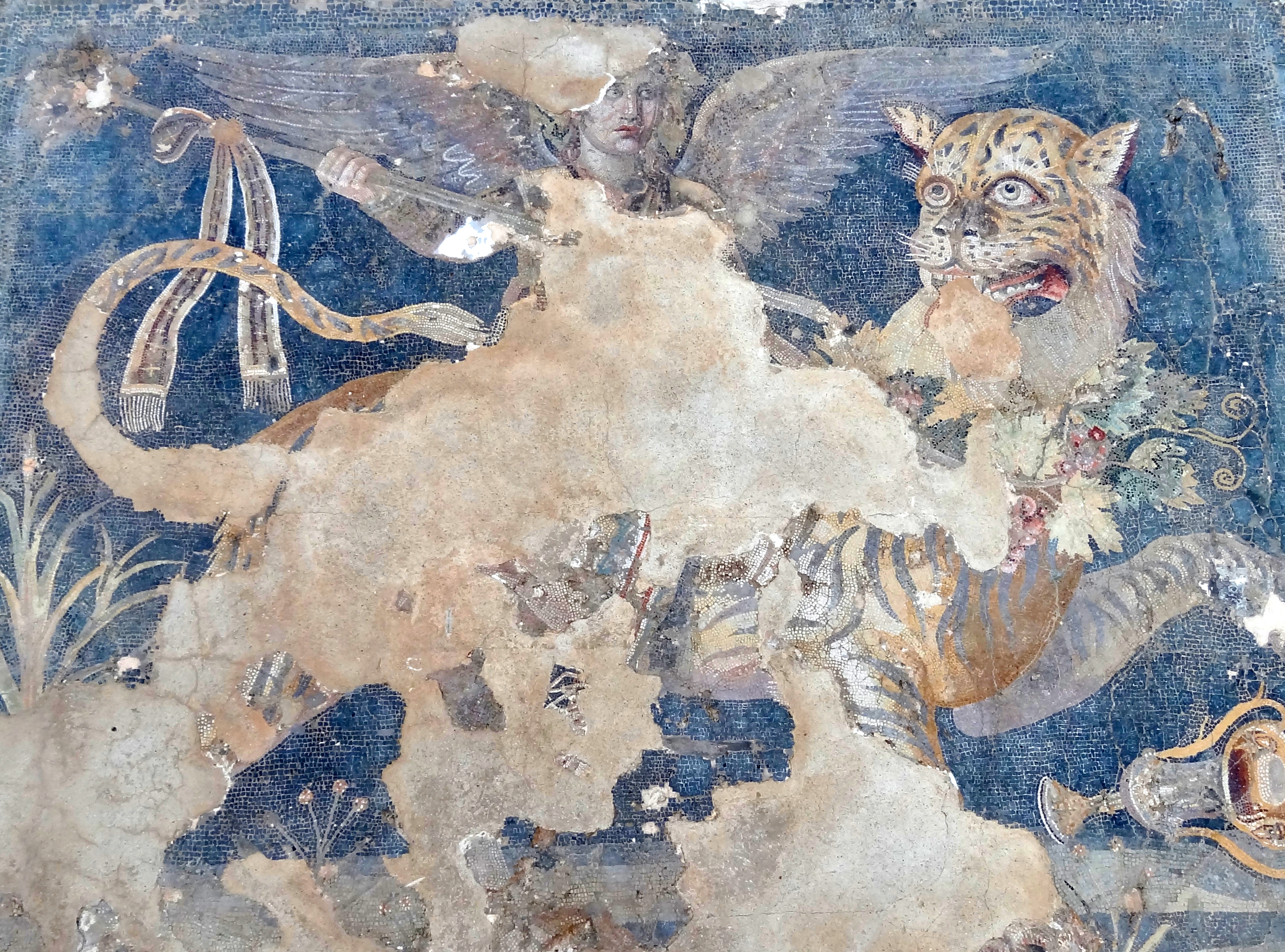
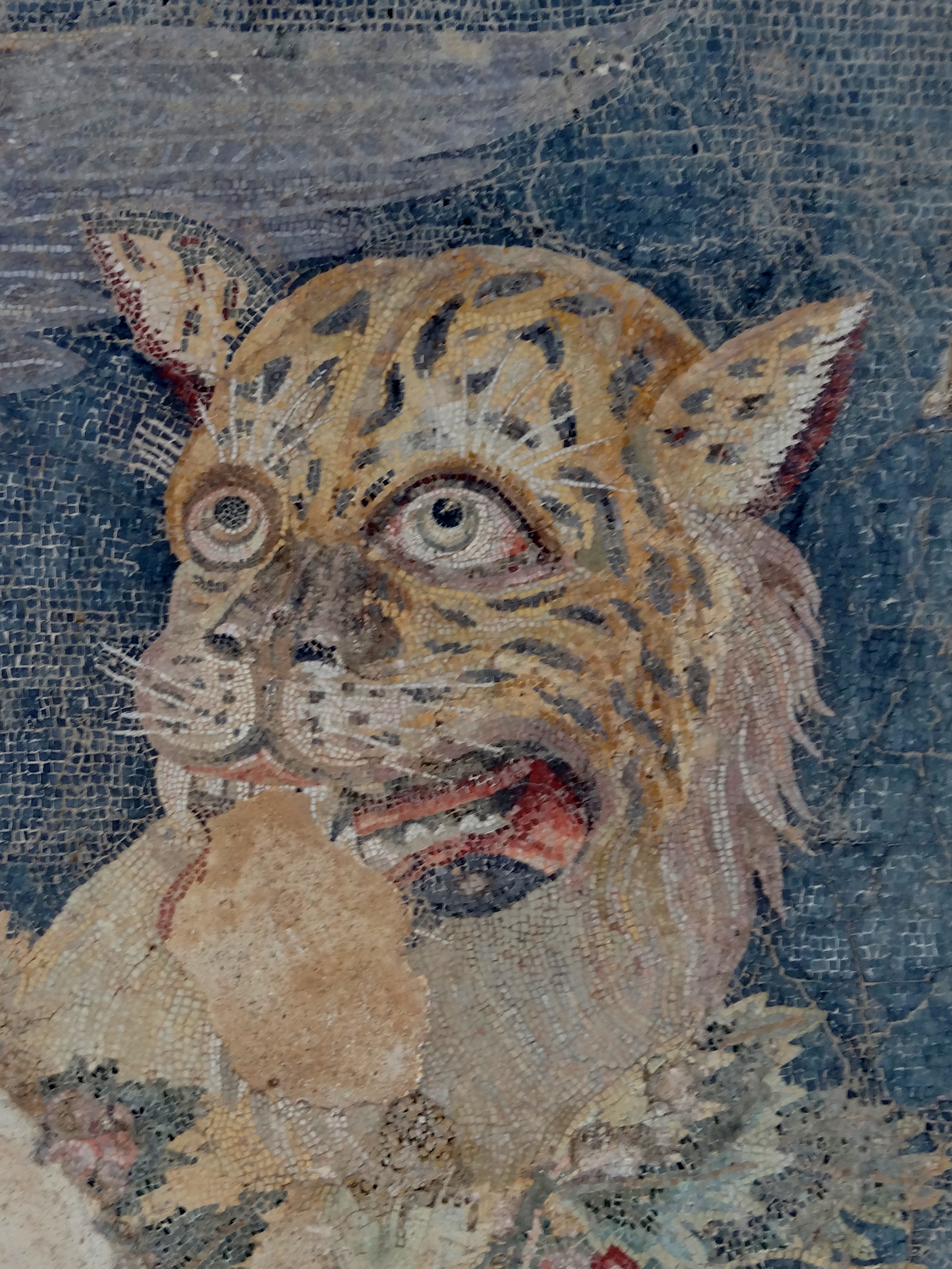
A Hellenistic Greek mosaic depicting the god Dionysos as a winged daimon riding on a tiger, from the House of Dionysos at Delos in the South Aegean region of Greece, late 2nd century BC, Archaeological Museum of Delos

The mosaics of Delos are a significant body of ancient Greek mosaic art. Most of the surviving mosaics from Delos, Greece, an island in the Cyclades, date to the last half of the 2nd century BC and early 1st century BC, during the Hellenistic period and beginning of the Roman period of Greece. Hellenistic mosaics were no longer produced after roughly 69 BC, due to warfare with the Kingdom of Pontus and the subsequently abrupt decline of the island's population and position as a major trading center. Among Hellenistic Greek archaeological sites, Delos contains one of the highest concentrations of surviving mosaic artworks. Approximately half of all surviving tessellated Greek mosaics from the Hellenistic period come from Delos.

The paved walkways of Delos range from simple pebble or chip-pavement constructions to elaborate mosaic floors composed of tesserae. Most motifs contain simple geometric patterns, while only a handful utilize the opus tessellatum and opus vermiculatum techniques to create lucid, naturalistic, and richly colored scenes and figures. Mosaics have been found in places of worship, public buildings, and private homes, the latter usually containing either an irregular-shaped floor plan or peristyle central courtyard.

Although there are minor traces of Punic-Phoenician and Romano-Italian influence, the Delian mosaics generally conform to the major trends found in Hellenistic art. The same wealthy patrons who commissioned paintings and sculptures at Delos may have also been involved in hiring mosaic artists from abroad. Delian mosaics share characteristics with those in other parts of the Greek world, such as Macedonian mosaics in Pella. They also bear some attributes with Greek painting traditions and often employ a similar black-background technique found in red-figure pottery of the Classical period. Some of the styles and techniques found at Delos are evident in Roman art and mosaics, although contemporary Roman examples from Pompeii, for instance, reveal significant differences in the production and design of mosaics in the western versus eastern Mediterranean.

== Dating ==
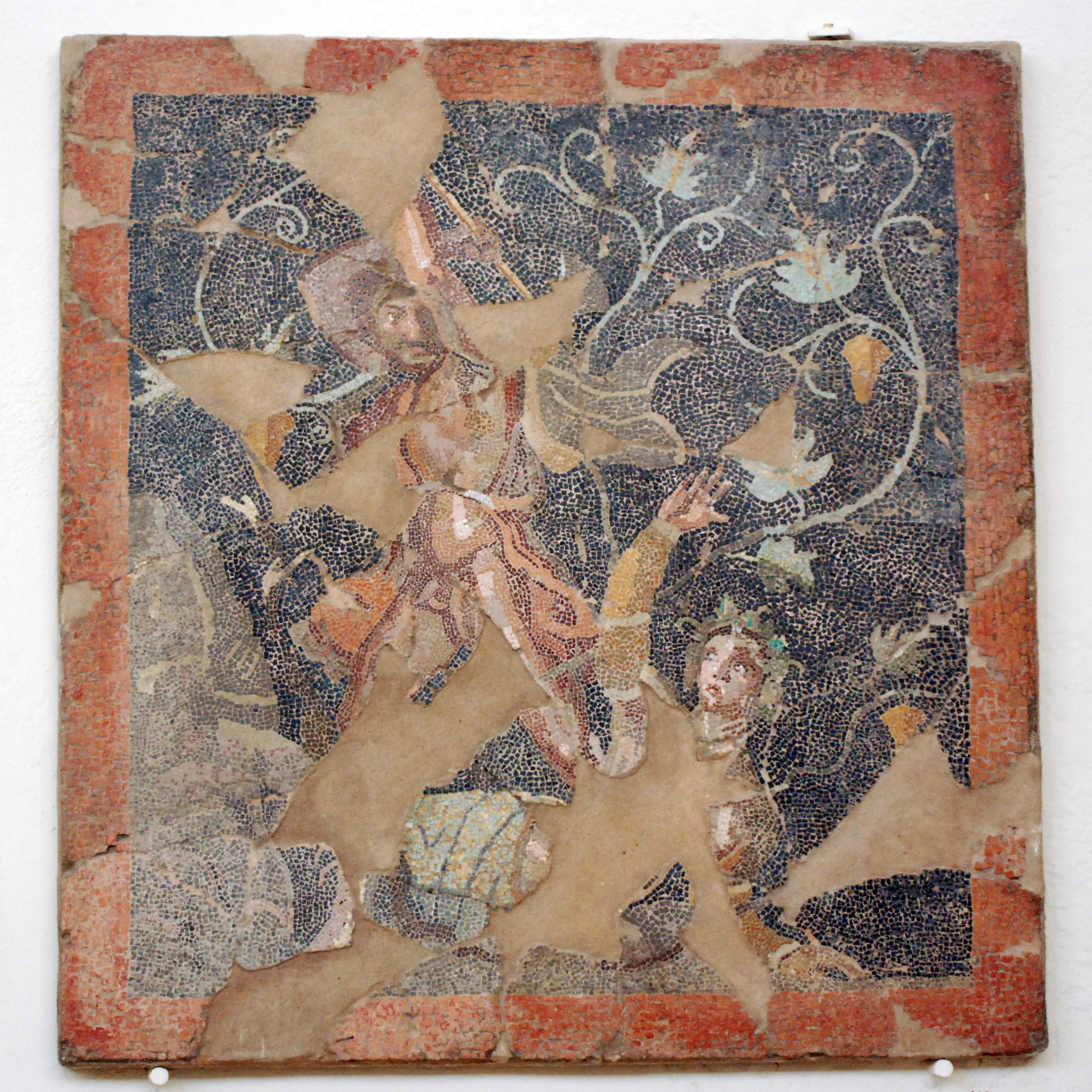
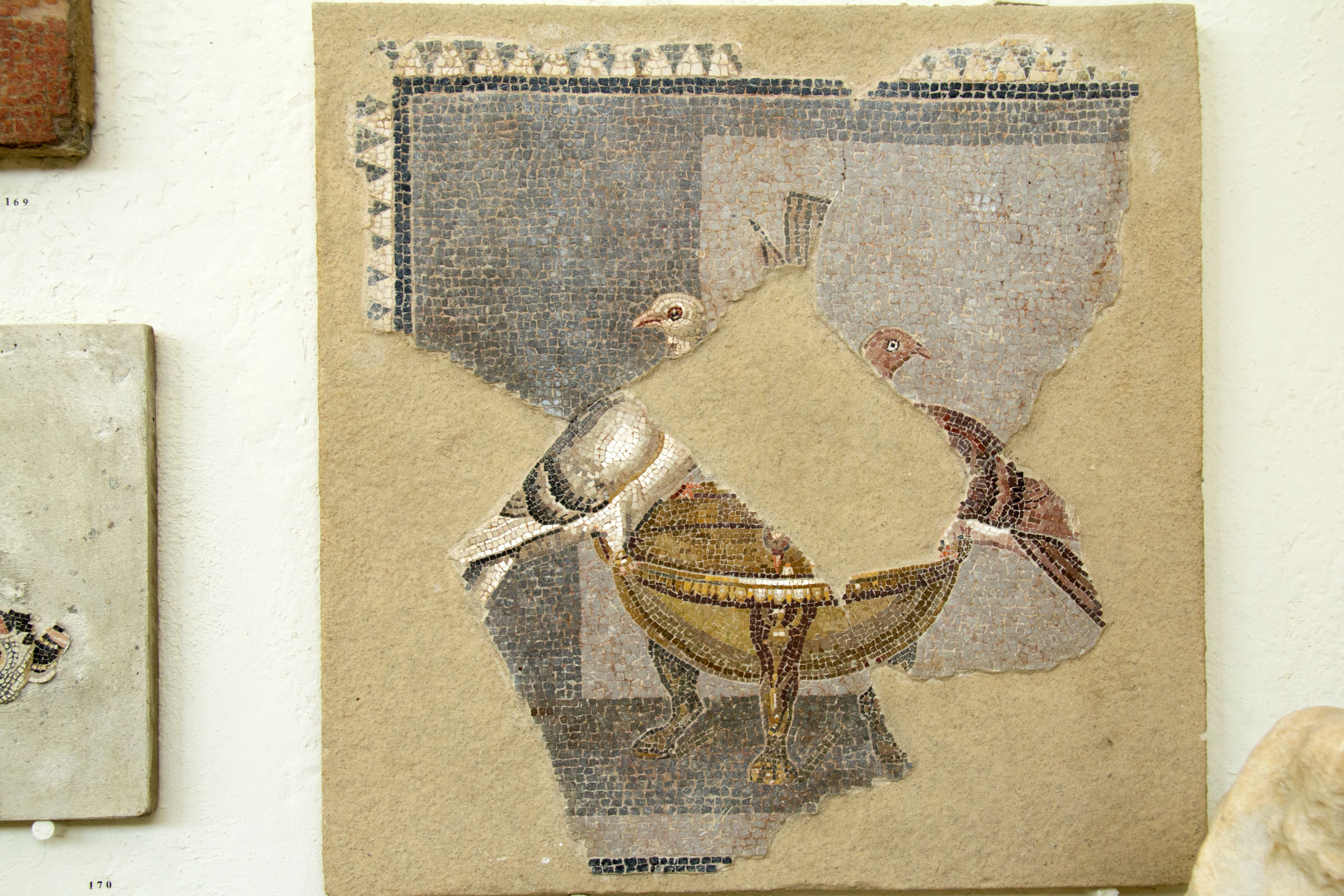
Left: King Lycurgus of Thrace killing Ambrosia, from the Northern Quarter of Delos, Archaeological Museum of Delos
Right: a Delian mosaic with pigeons flocking around a bowl, Archaeological Museum of Delos

Archaeological excavations of Delos by the French School at Athens began in 1872, with initial descriptions of the mosaics published in a report by French archaeologist Jacques Albert Lebègue in 1876. Precisely 354 mosaics from Delos survive and have been studied by French archaeologist Philippe Bruneau. Most date to the late Hellenistic period, contemporaneous with the late Roman Republic (i.e. the last half of the 2nd century BC and early 1st century BC). A handful were dated to the Classical period, with one mosaic attributed to the Imperial Roman era. Bruneau believed that nominally undated pieces, on the basis of their styles, were produced within the same period as the majority of examples, roughly between 133 and 88 BC.

In 167 or 166 BC, after the Roman victory in the Third Macedonian War, Rome ceded the island of Delos to the Athenians, who expelled most of the original inhabitants. The Roman destruction of Corinth in 146 BC allowed Delos to at least partially assume the former's role as the premier trading center of Greece. Delos' commercial prosperity, construction activity, and population waned significantly after the island was assaulted by the forces of Mithridates VI of Pontus in 88 and 69 BC, during the Mithridatic Wars with Rome. Despite the invasions by Pontus, the island was only gradually abandoned after Rome secured a more direct trading link with the Orient that marginalized Delos as a pivotal midway point for trade leading to the East.

== Characteristics ==
=== Composition ===
The composition of the Delos mosaics and pavements include simple pebble constructions, chip-pavement made of white marble, ceramic fragments, and pieces of tesserae. The latter falls into two categories: the simpler, tessellated opus tessellatum using large pieces of tesserae, on average eight by eight millimeters, and the finer opus vermiculatum using pieces of tesserae smaller than four by four millimeters. Many Delian mosaics use a mixture of these materials, while chip pavement is the most common. The latter is found in 55 homes and usually reserved for the ground floor. The majority of Delian mosaics comprise broken pieces of marble set into cement floors; other flooring bases are composed of either rammed earth or gneiss flagstones. Pavements in kitchens and latrines were built with pottery, brick, and tile fragments for the purpose of waterproofing. Thin strips of lead set into the cement are often used to distinguish the contours of geometric-patterned mosaics, but are absent in the more complex tessellated, figured mosaics.

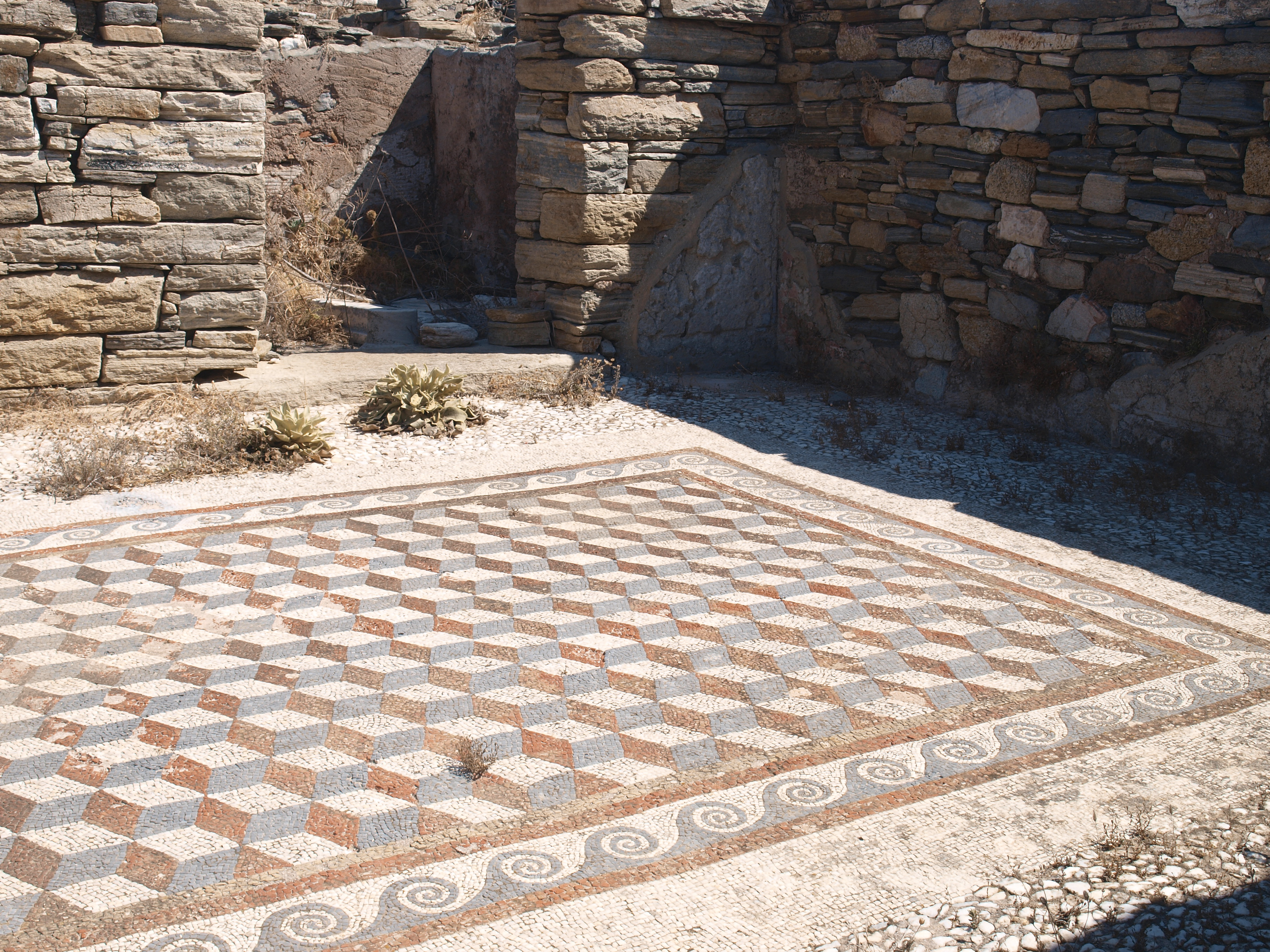
A cubic floor mosaic in a house on the island of Delos

=== Arrangement and location ===
While some mosaics have been unearthed from religious sanctuaries and public buildings, most of them were found in residential buildings and private homes. The majority of these houses possess an irregular-shaped floor plan, while the second largest group were built with a peristyle central courtyard. Simple mosaics were usually relegated to normal walkways, whereas rooms designated for receiving guests featured more richly decorated mosaics. However, only 25 houses of Delos feature opus tessellatum mosaics and only eight houses possess the opus vermiculatum-style motifs and figured scenes. The vast majority of decorated floors feature only simple geometric patterns. It is also more common for opus vermiculatum and opus tessellatum mosaics to be found in upstairs rooms than on the ground floors of ancient Delian homes. With the exception of the House of Dionysos and House of the Dolphins, the courtyards of peristyle homes in Delos feature only floral and geometric motifs.

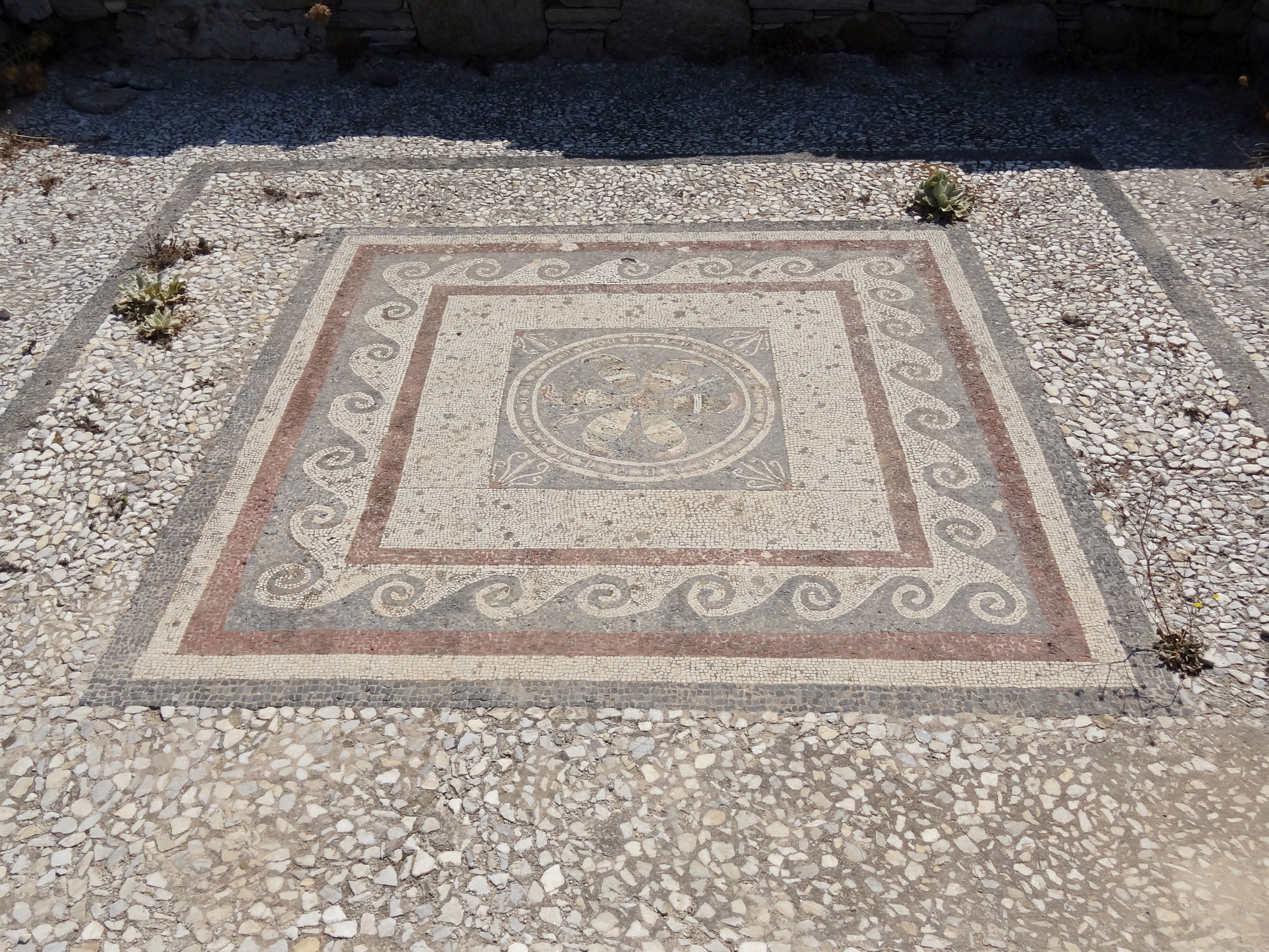
A Delian mosaic bearing the central rosette motif surrounded by a single-wave border pattern

=== Patterns and motifs ===
Among the various patterns and motifs found in Delian mosaics is the triple-colored lozenge that creates a three-dimensional illusion of cubes in perspective for the viewer. This pattern appears in fifteen different locations, making it one of the most common. Other motifs include waves and stepped triangles, while major themes include maritime, theatrical, natural, or mythological objects and figures. The single wave pattern, a common motif in Hellenistic art, is the most predominant type of border design for mosaics at Delos and can be found at other sites such as Arsameia (albeit arranged in the opposite direction). The rosette motif, which is found in the mosaics of various Hellenistic sites across the Mediterranean, is often coupled with single-wave borders in Delian mosaics. The typical Hellenistic palmette motif is used in a mosaic of Delos to fill the four corners around a central rosette motif. The illusion of three-dimensional relief in the figured scenes of Delian mosaics was usually achieved by the use of polychrome, with white, black, yellow, red, blue and green hues.

The origins of the composition, techniques, layout, and style of Delian mosaics can be found in 5th-century BC pebble mosaics of Olynthus in the Chalcidice of northern Greece, with mosaics positioned in the center of cement floors and utilizing garland, meander, and wave patterns around a centralized motif or figured scene. This design scheme is similar to that of 4th-century BC mosaics of Pella in Macedonia, although the pebble mosaics there employ a wider range of colors to create the effects of volume. The transition from pebble mosaics to more complex tessellated mosaics perhaps originated in Hellenistic-Greek Sicily during the 3rd century BC, developed at sites such as Morgantina and Syracuse. Much like Olynthus, mosaics of Morgantina contain the garland, wave, and meander patterns, although the latter was finally executed with perspective.

=== Culture and ethnic origins ===
Aside from a symbol of the Punic-Phoenician goddess Tanit, all pavement motifs are typically Hellenistic Greek in origin, although some pavement mortars used with tesserae designs betray some Italian influence. The three major ethnic groups of Delos included Greeks (largely of Athenian origin), Syrians/Phoenicians, and Italians/Romans, but it is very likely that many of these Italians were Italiotes, Greek-speaking natives of Magna Graecia in what is now southern Italy. Delian inhabitants of either Greek, Italian, and Syrian origins owned mosaics in their private households, but Vincent J. Bruno asserts that the designs of their mosaic artworks were indebted entirely to Greek artistic traditions.

== Significance ==
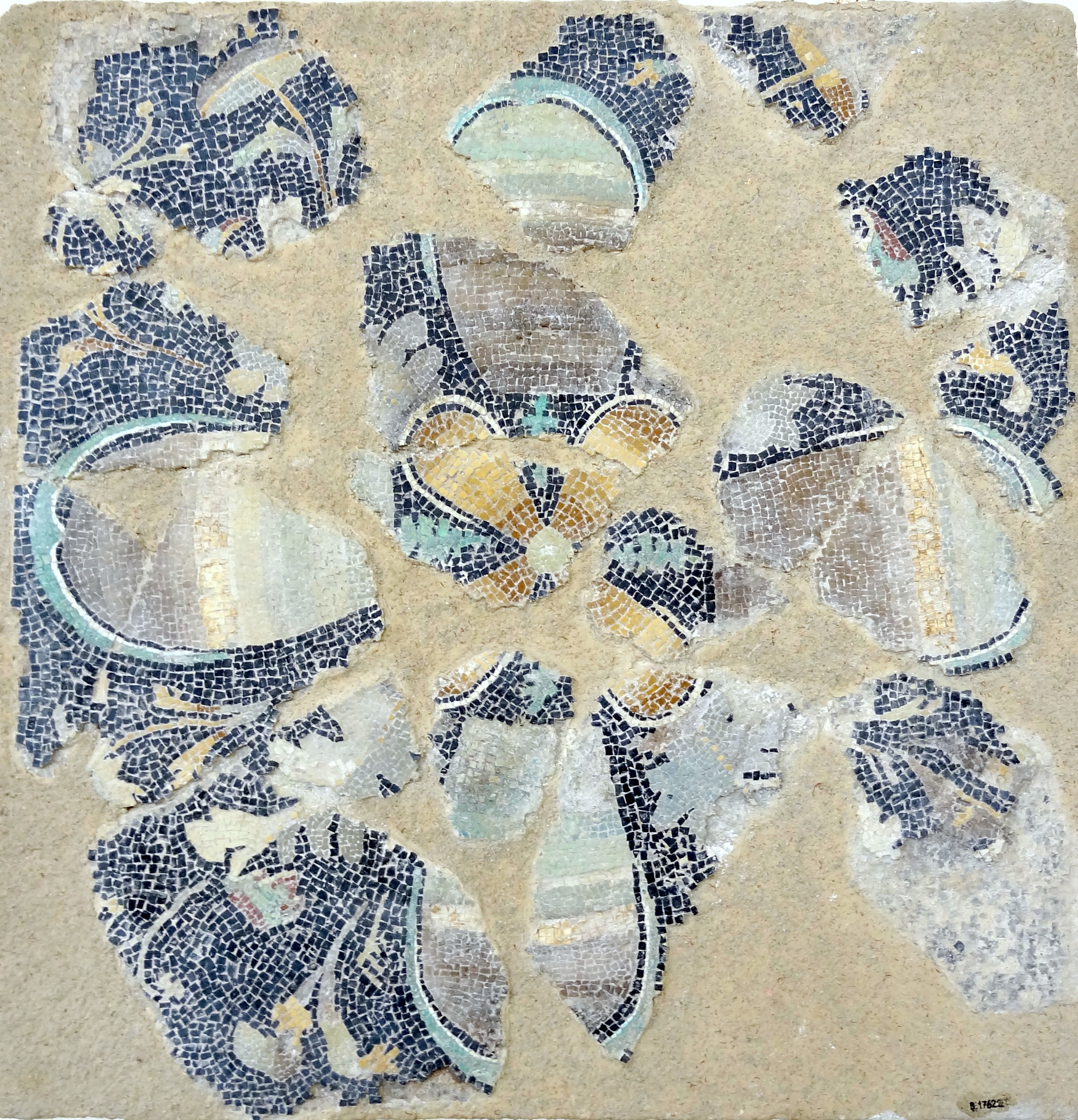
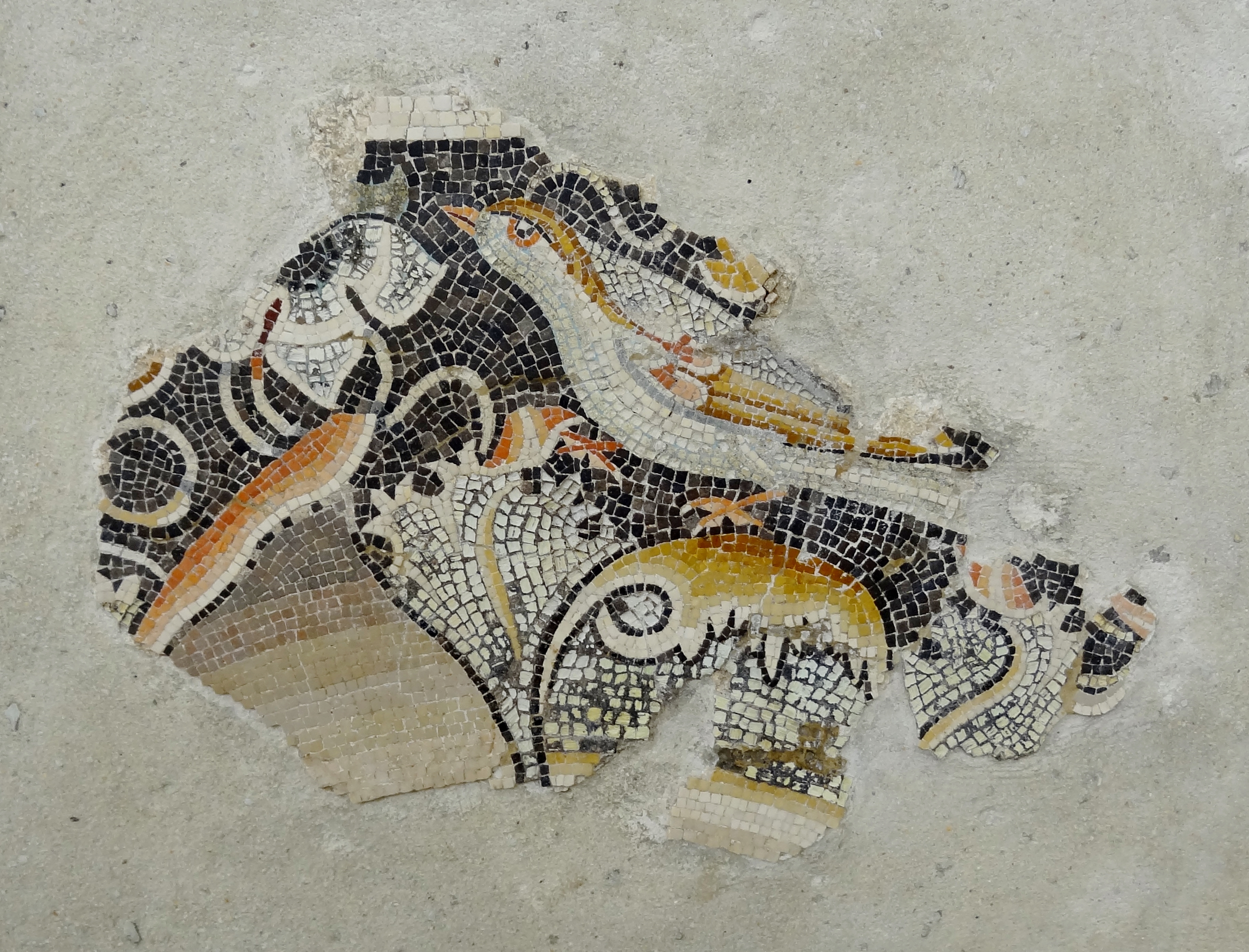
Delian mosaics with birds and foliage, c. 100 BC

=== The surviving corpus of Hellenistic mosaic art ===
The French archaeologist François Chamoux considered the mosaics of Delos as the "high-water mark" and pinnacle of ancient Greek mosaic art utilizing tesserae to create rich, detailed and colorful scenes. This Hellenistic style of mosaic continued until the end of Antiquity and may have influenced the widespread use of mosaics in the Western world during the Middle Ages. In her study of the households and artworks of Mediterranean trading centers, Birgit Tang analyzed three archaeological sites: Delos in the Aegean, Carthage in what is now modern Tunisia, and Emporion, modern Empúries in Catalonia, Spain, which was once a Greek colony. The reasons for her choosing these sites in particular for investigation and comparison include their status as major maritime trading hubs as well as their relatively well-preserved ruins of urban households.

Ruth Westgate writes that Delos contains roughly half of all surviving tessellated Greek mosaics from the Hellenistic period. In her estimation the sites of Delos and Morgantina and Soluntum in Sicily contain the largest amount of surviving evidence for Hellenistic Greek mosaics. Hariclia Brecoulaki asserts that the Delos mosaics represent the single largest collection of Greek mosaics. She also states that only the Macedonian capital of Pella ranks as an equal in having private homes (as opposed to royal residences) decorated with elaborate wall paintings, signed mosaics, and freestanding marble sculptures. Katherine M. D. Dunbabin writes that while many Hellenistic mosaics have been found in mainland Greece, Asia Minor, and northeast Africa (i.e. Cyrene), it is only at the site of Delos where they occur in "sufficient numbers to allow general conclusions about their use and nature."

=== Comparisons with Roman Pompeii ===
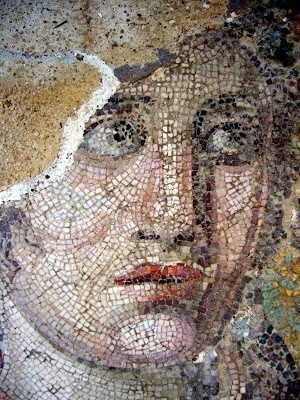
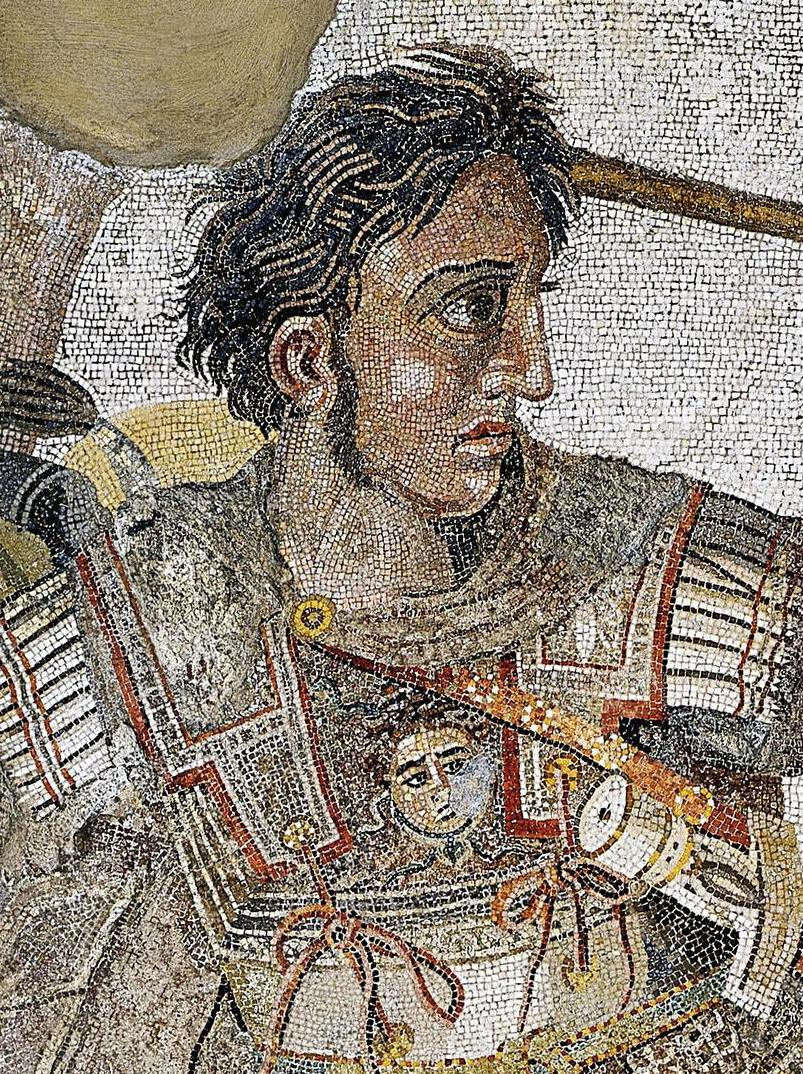
Left image: detail of the face of Dionysos, from a mosaic in the House of Dionysos, Delos, Greece, late 2nd century BC
Right image: detail of Alexander the Great, from the Alexander Mosaic, House of the Faun, Pompeii, Italy, late 2nd or early 1st century BC

In her comparative analysis of mosaic art in the Greco-Roman world, Hetty Joyce chose the mosaics of Delos and Roman Pompeii as chief representative samples for determining distinctions in the form, function, and production techniques of mosaics in the Greek East and Latin West. Her reasoning for the selection of these two sites are their well-preserved pavements, the secure dating of the samples to the late 2nd and early 1st centuries BC, and, thanks to the extensive documentation of Delian mosaics by Bruneau, a sufficient amount of academic literature dedicated to each site to form comparisons. Ruth Westgate, in her survey and comparative study of Hellenistic Greek mosaics with mosaics of Pompeii, concludes that the Roman mosaics, dated to the Pompeian First Style of wall painting in the late 2nd and early 1st centuries BC, were derived from the Greek tradition. However, she stresses that Pompeian mosaics departed from their Greek counterparts by almost exclusively featuring figured scenes instead of abstract designs, in plain pavement most likely set by local craftsmen and produced separately from the figured panels, the latter of which were perhaps made by Greek artisans for their Roman patrons.

Due to the similarities between the Hellenistic wall paintings at Delos and the First Style of Pompeii, Joyce contends that the differences in Delian and Pompeian mosaics are the deliberate product of artistic preference rather than the result of ignorance of each other's traditions. These differences include the widespread use of opus signinum at Pompeii, with only four known examples at Delos; the use of opus sectile at Pompeii and its complete absence at Delos; the prevalent use of polychrome patterns and intricate, three-dimensional figured designs in Delian mosaics versus two-dimensional designs at Pompeii, which at best utilize two colors. Complex three-dimensional figured mosaics using polychrome designs to achieve the illusion of light and shadow were not produced at Pompeii until the Pompeian Second Style of wall painting (80–20 BC) and are considered an adoption from Hellenistic art trends. While lead strips were used in Hellenistic mosaics of Delos, Athens, and Pella (Greece), Pergamon (Turkey), Callatis (Romania), Alexandria (Egypt), and Chersonesus (the Crimean Peninsula), they are absent in Western Mediterranean mosaics of Malta, Sicily, and the Italian Peninsula. Westgate affirms that Hellenistic mosaics can be divided into two broad categories: eastern and western, based on their different styles and production techniques.

=== Connections to other mediums of ancient Greek art ===
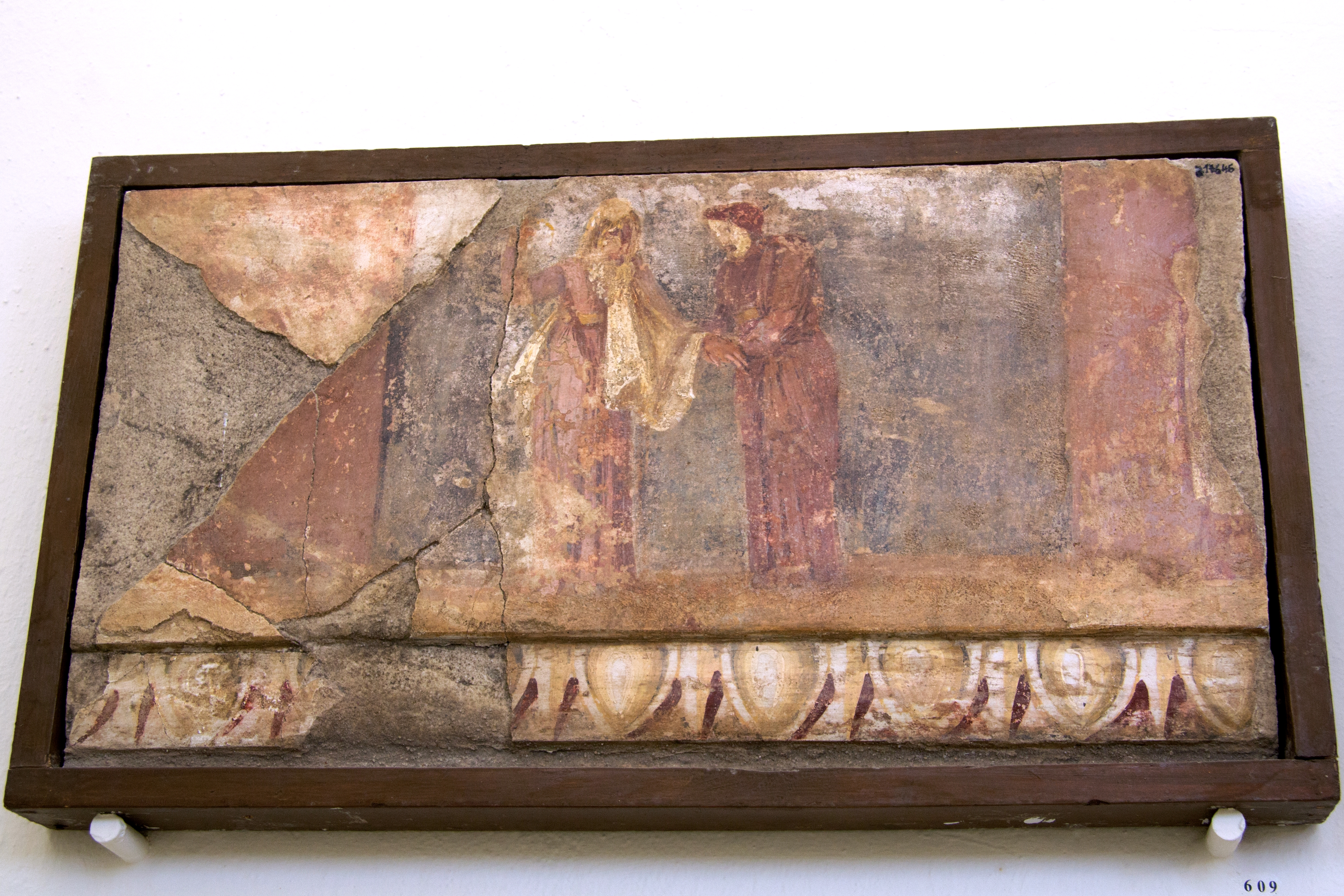
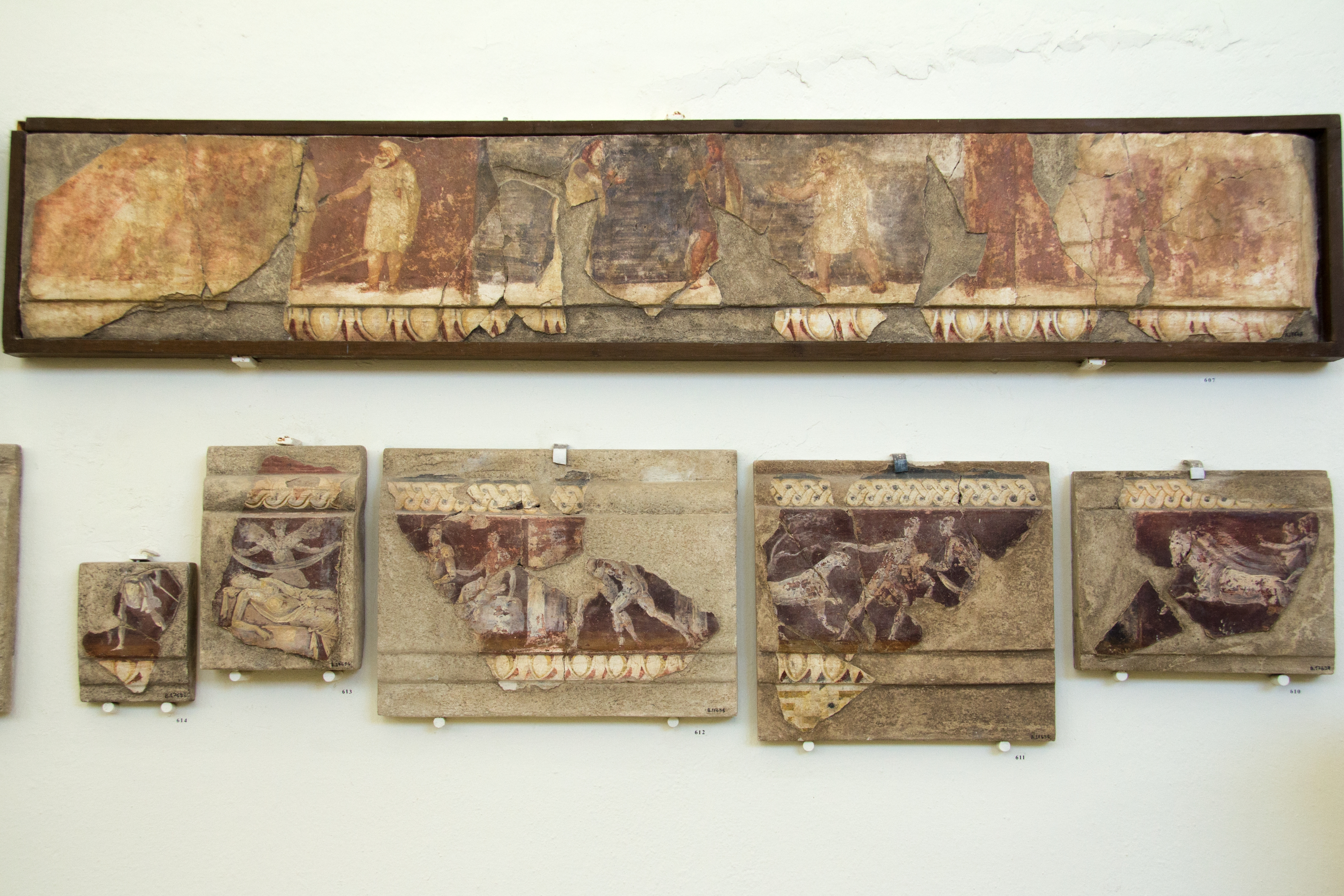
Fragments of mural paintings from Delos, c. 100 BC

Red-figure pottery was no longer produced by the time the Delos mosaics were made. The black background technique of red-figure pottery was still appreciated in 4th-century-BC Macedonian pebble mosaics from Pella and in mosaics at Delos, such as the white-figured Triton mosaic with tesserae. The black background technique was later used in glass art such as cameo glass, particularly Roman glass (e.g. Portland Vase, Gemma Augustea, Great Cameo of France, etc.).

The undulating garland motif against a black background from the masonry-style mural paintings at Delos were earlier featured in Greek works ranging from vases to 4th-century-BC Macedonian mosaics of Pella, particularly the Stag Hunt Mosaic. However, the painters of Delos arguably invented their own decorative genre using a combination of these older elements with new naturalistic coloring. Aside from the black background, mosaics like the Stag Hunt Mosaic were also inspired by the illusionist, three-dimensional qualities of Greek paintings. At Delos, paintings and mosaics inherited the same Classical Greek standards of craftsmanship, lighting, shading, and coloring. Sculptors, painters, and mosaic artists may have all been part of the same system of patronage at Delos, which in some instances would have necessitated the importation of foreign artists.

== Houses and city quarters ==
=== Mosaics from the Northern Quarter ===
The northern quarter of Delos contains the Jewelry Quarter, where older structures such as workshops and other archaeological remains dating to the 3rd century BC and early 2nd century BC have been discovered. By the second half of the 2nd century BC these were replaced by private homes built in the most characteristic fashion for Delos: a narrow, rectangular floor plan with a central courtyard, a vestibule service room in the front, and a larger, main room in the rear. The quarter of the House of the Masks is the only area of Delos without this archetypal house plan. Some houses of the Northern Quarter feature mosaic decorations with mythological scenes, including Lycurgus of Thrace and Ambrosia in an upper-story mosaic, as well as Athena and Hermes together with a seated woman in a main-room mosaic.

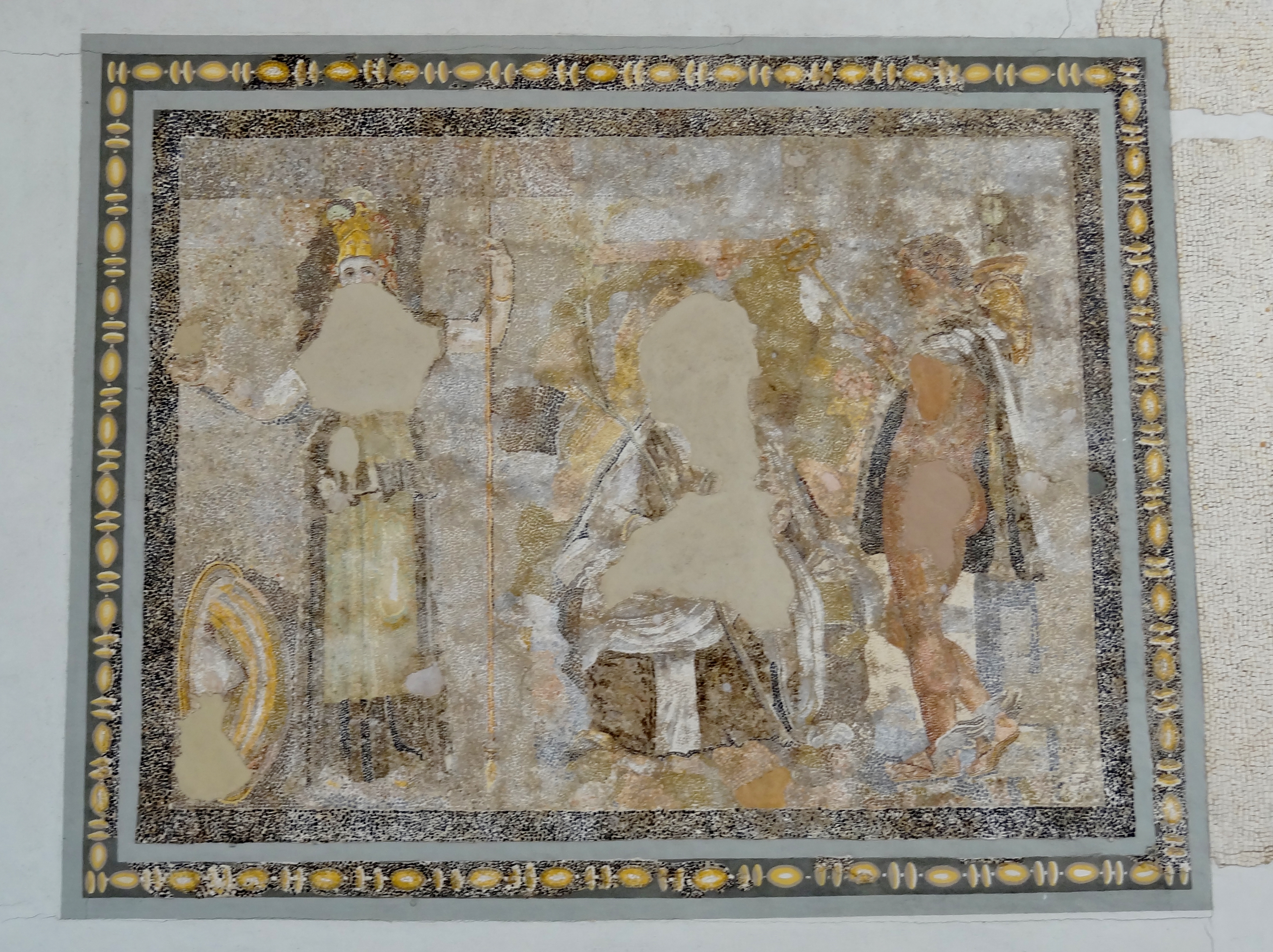
Detail of the centerpiece of a mosaic from the Jewelry Quarter of Delos depicting Hermes and Athena, 2nd century BC

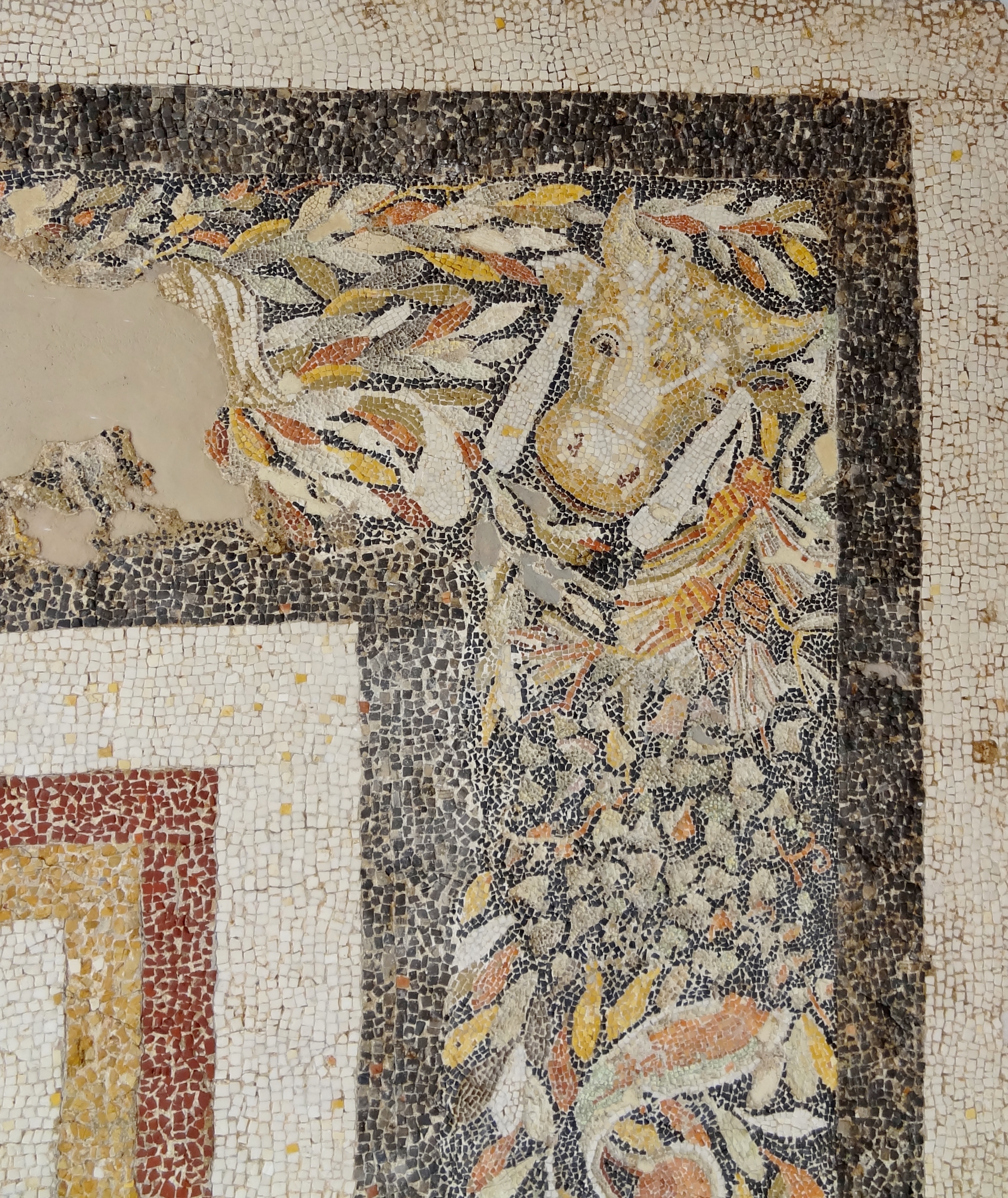
Detail of a mosaic from the Jewelry Quarter of Delos depicting a bull's head with foliage

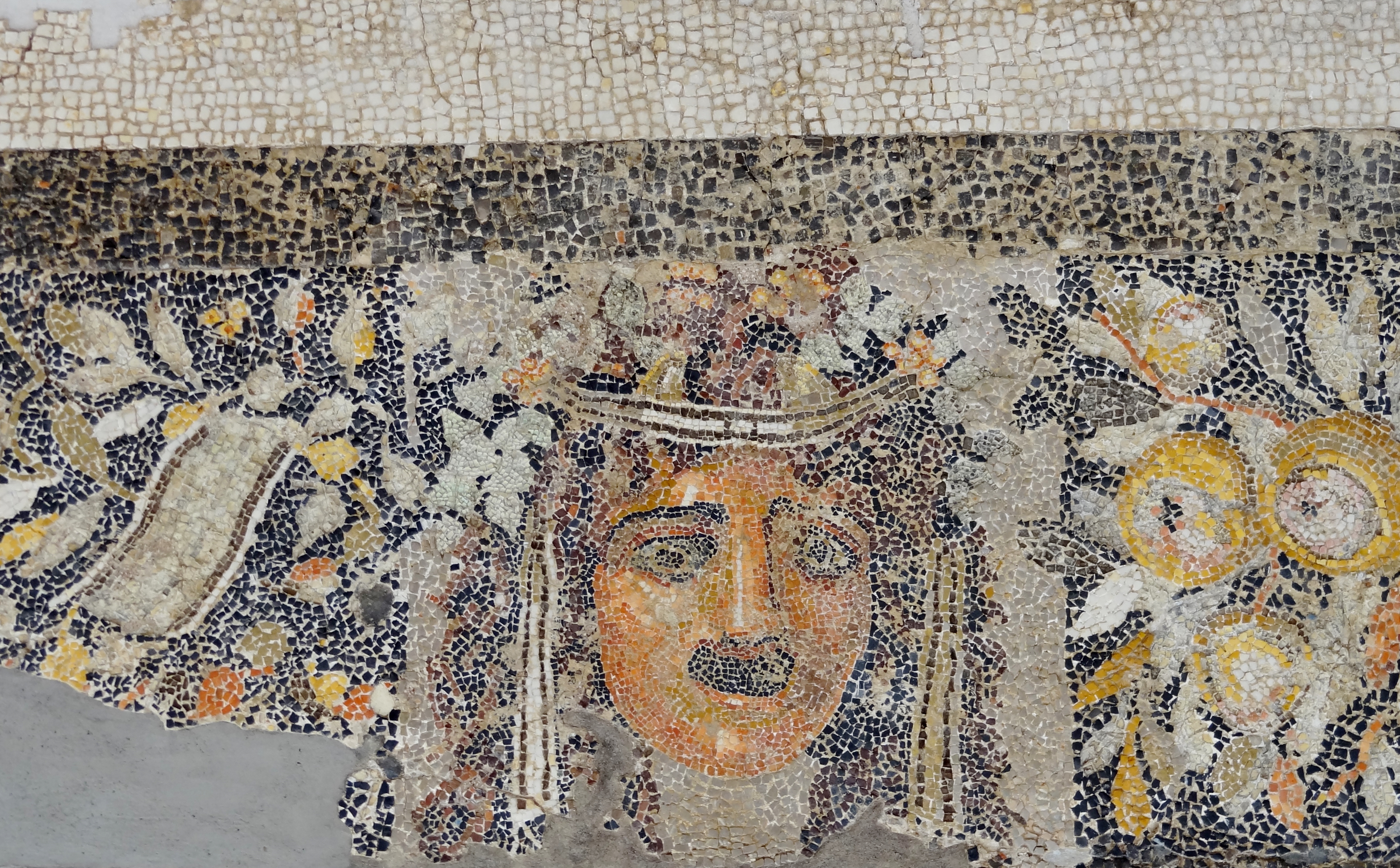
Detail of a mosaic from the Jewelry Quarter of Delos depicting an ancient Greek theatre mask

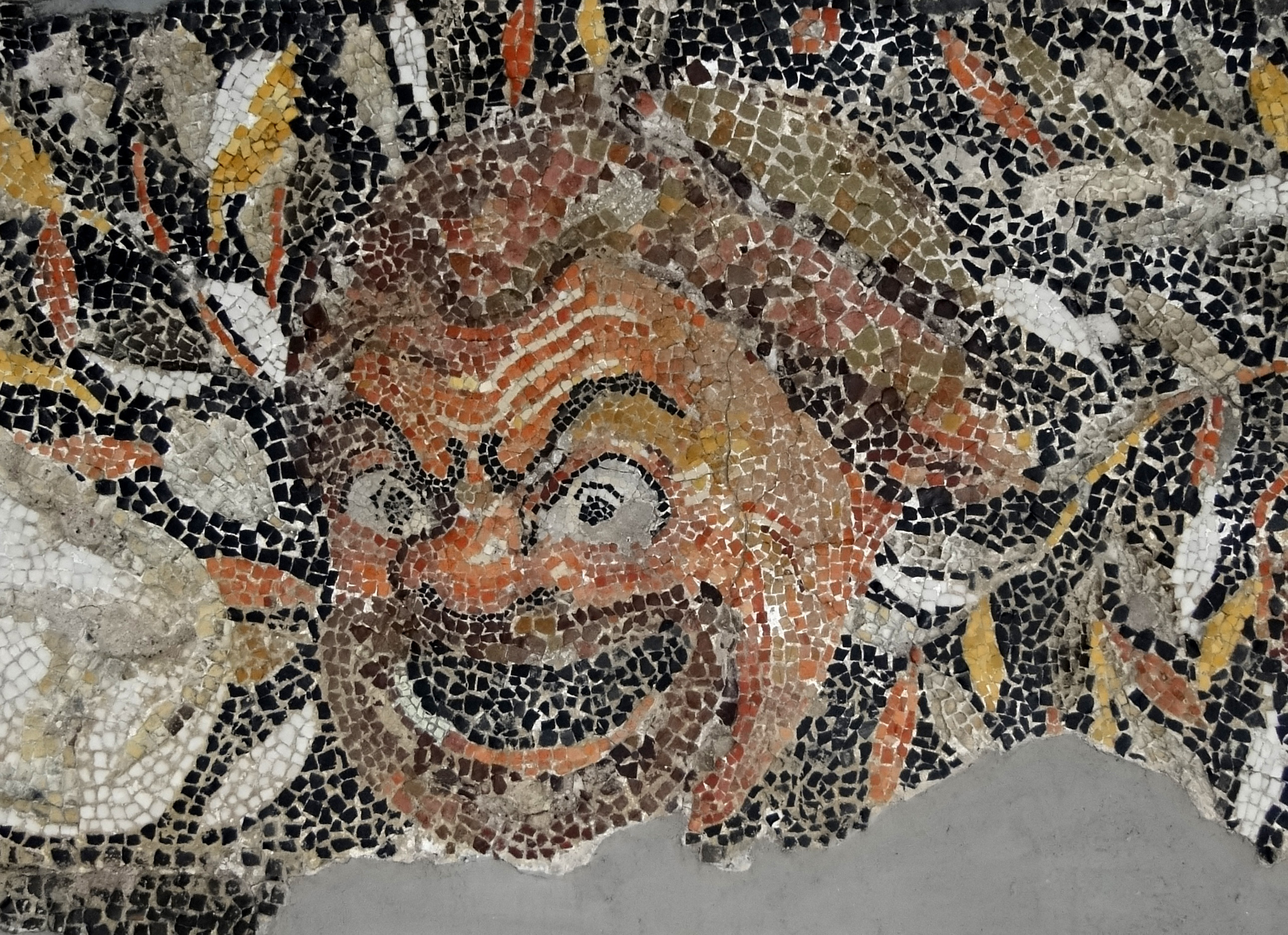
Detail of a mosaic from the Jewelry Quarter of Delos depicting an ancient Greek theatre mask

=== Mosaics from the Theatre Quarter ===
Most houses in the crowded Theatre Quarter of Delos have irregular-shaped floor plans (such as trapezoidal designs), as opposed to square or rectangular designs. The narrow and irregular street grid is unlike that of other quarters, where streets usually meet at approximately right angles. Similar to the majority of excavated homes of Delos, those in the Theatre Quarter feature an open courtyard without porticoes, instead of the peristyle layout with columns. Some of the houses in the Theatre Quarter lack interior decoration altogether, with neither wall murals nor mosaics, which is unusual for most Delian homes.

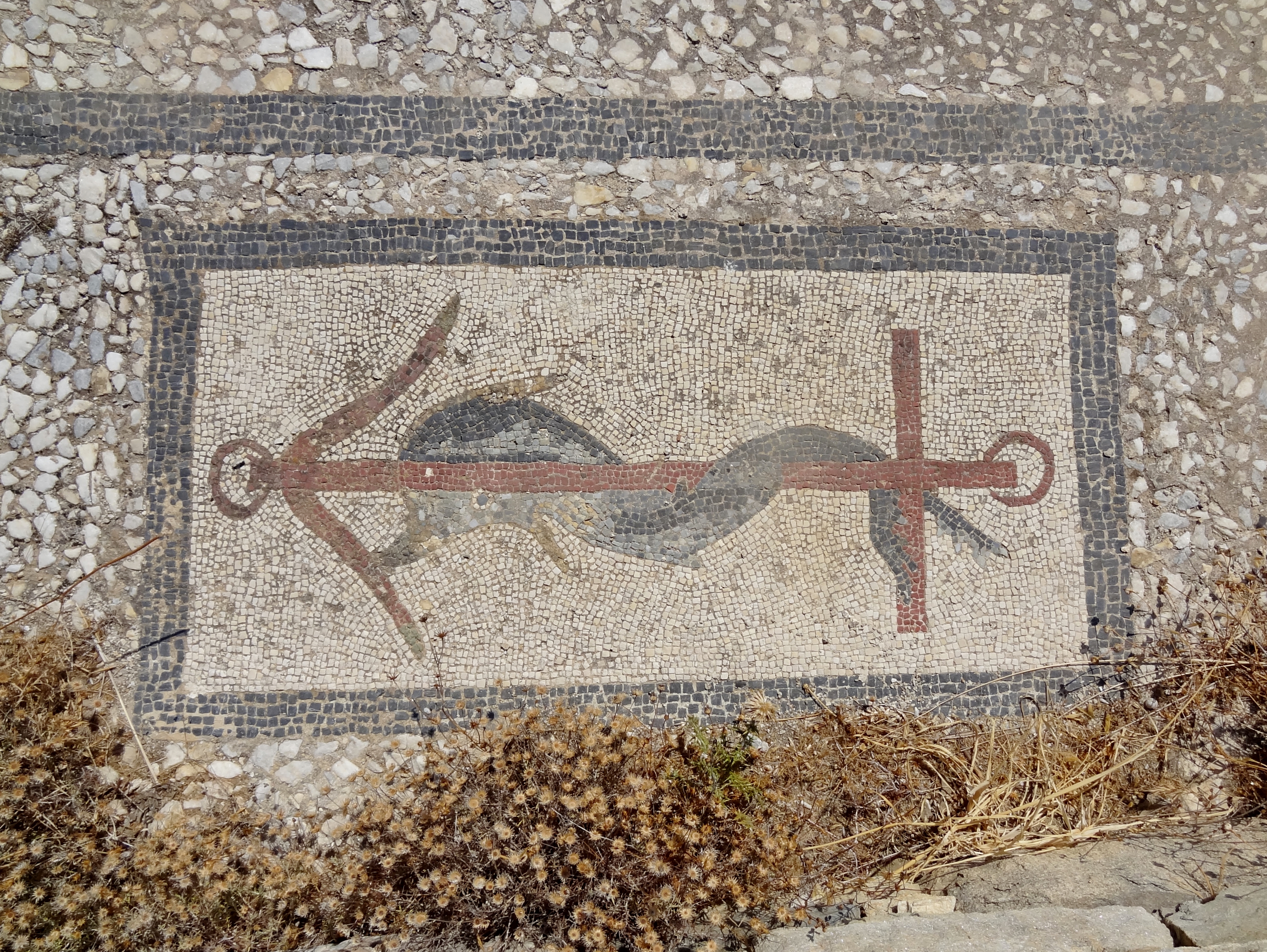
A mosaic with a dolphin and anchor design

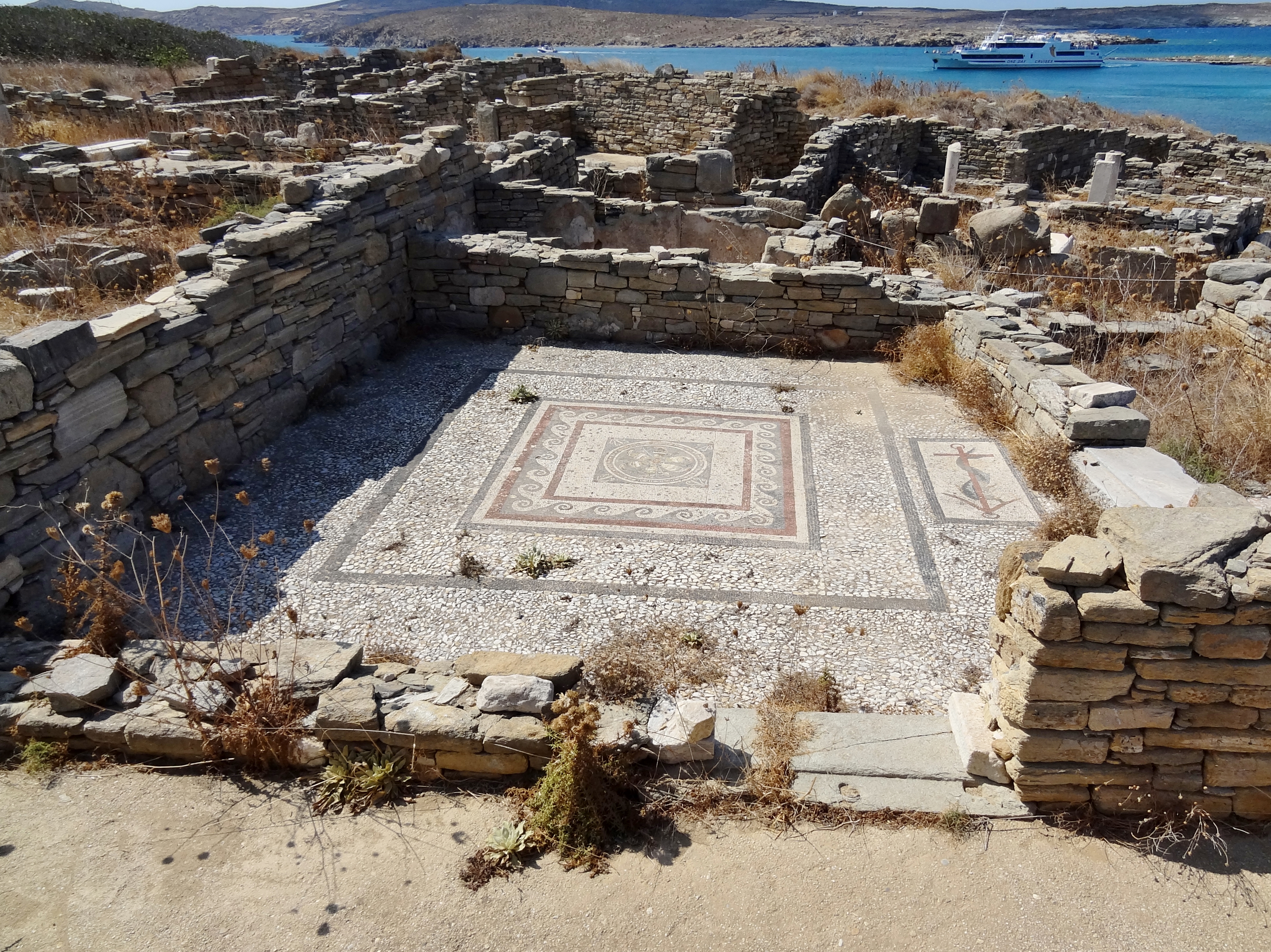
The ruins of a home with a mosaic floor

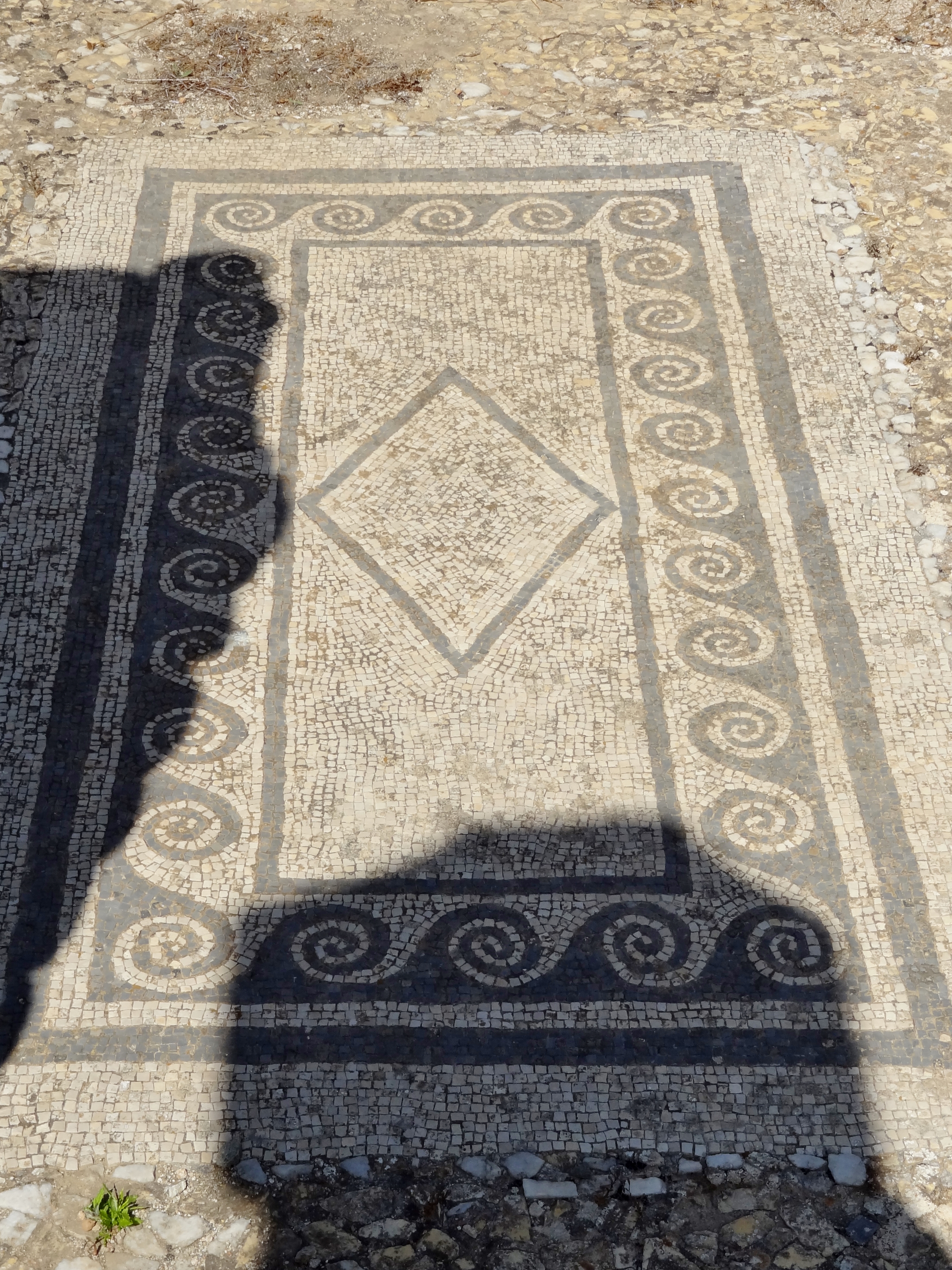
A mosaic with a wave pattern border

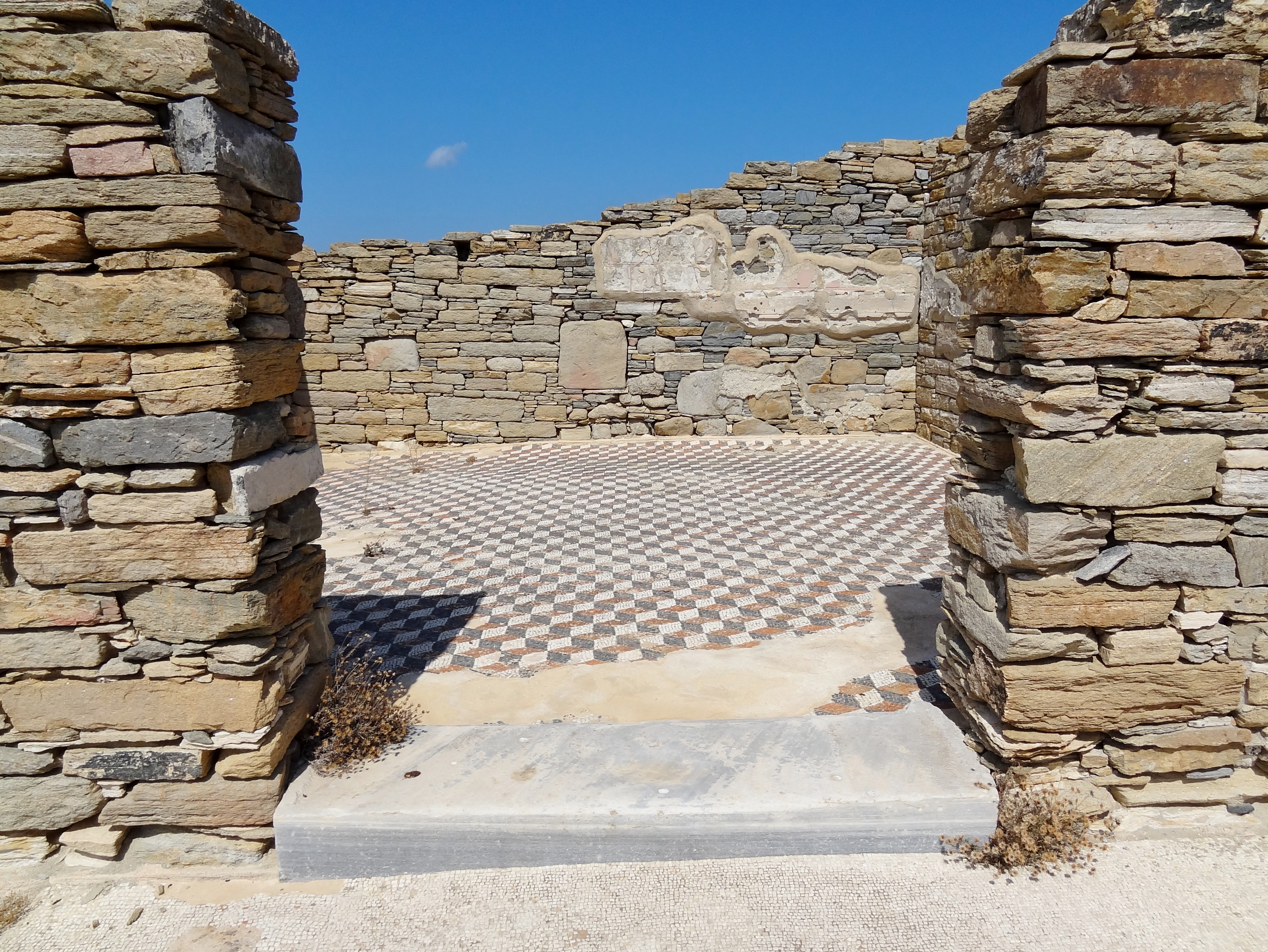
Cubic geometric-patterned floor mosaic in the ruins of a home

=== House of Dionysos ===
The Delos mosaic of Dionysos riding a tiger in the House of Dionysos is one of the finest examples of opus vermiculatum, according to Dunbabin, and is comparable to the Dionysos riding a leopard from the House of the Masks if not the simpler pebble-mosaic predecessor from the Macedonian capital at Pella. A key thematic difference, however, are the wings of Dionysos that suggest his incarnation as a daimon instead of a god. The tesserae materials, made of glass, faience, terracotta and natural stones, are fashioned into pieces measuring roughly one millimeter square, allowing for sharp detail and an elaborate color scheme.

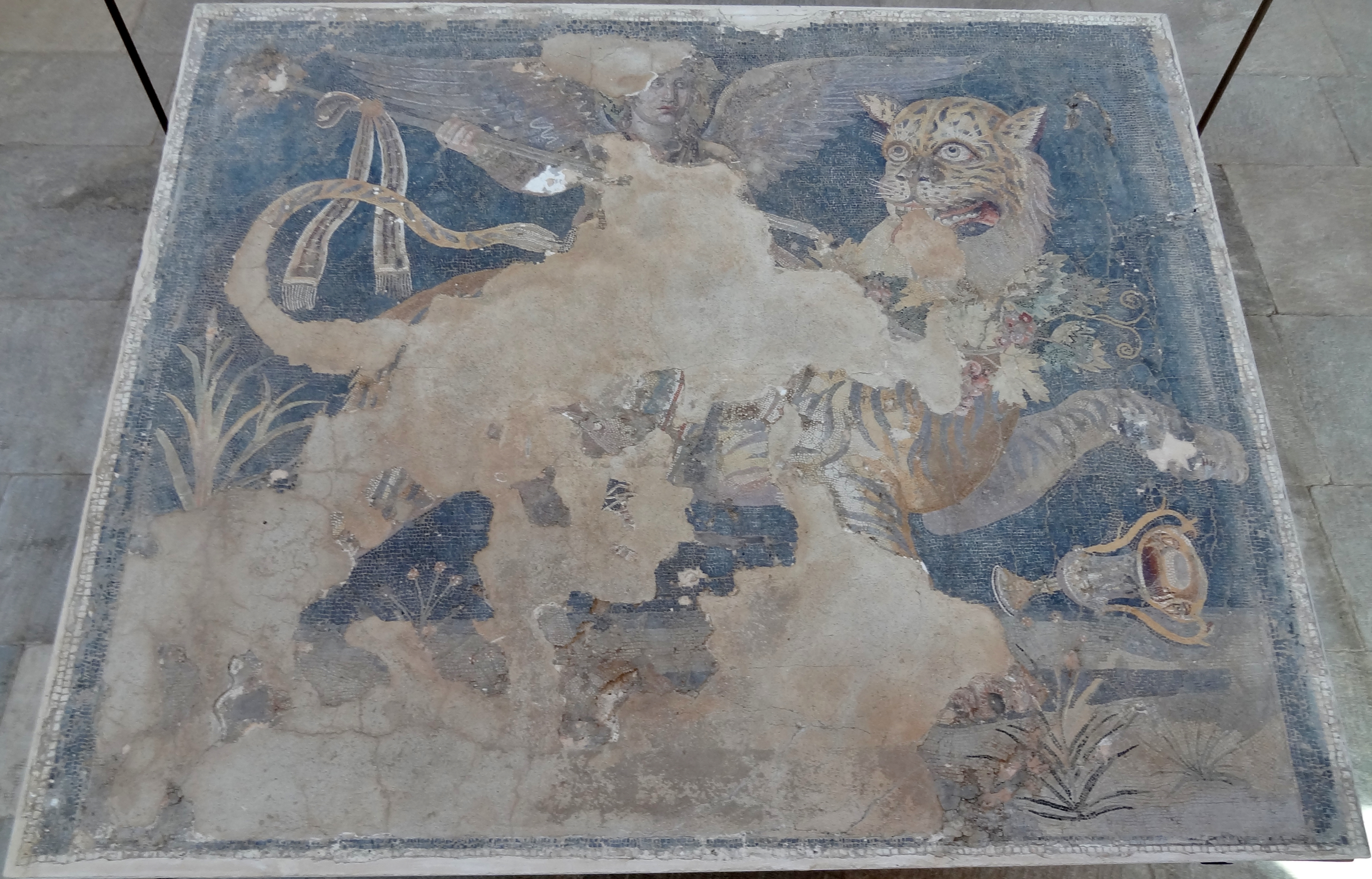
Dionysos riding a tiger

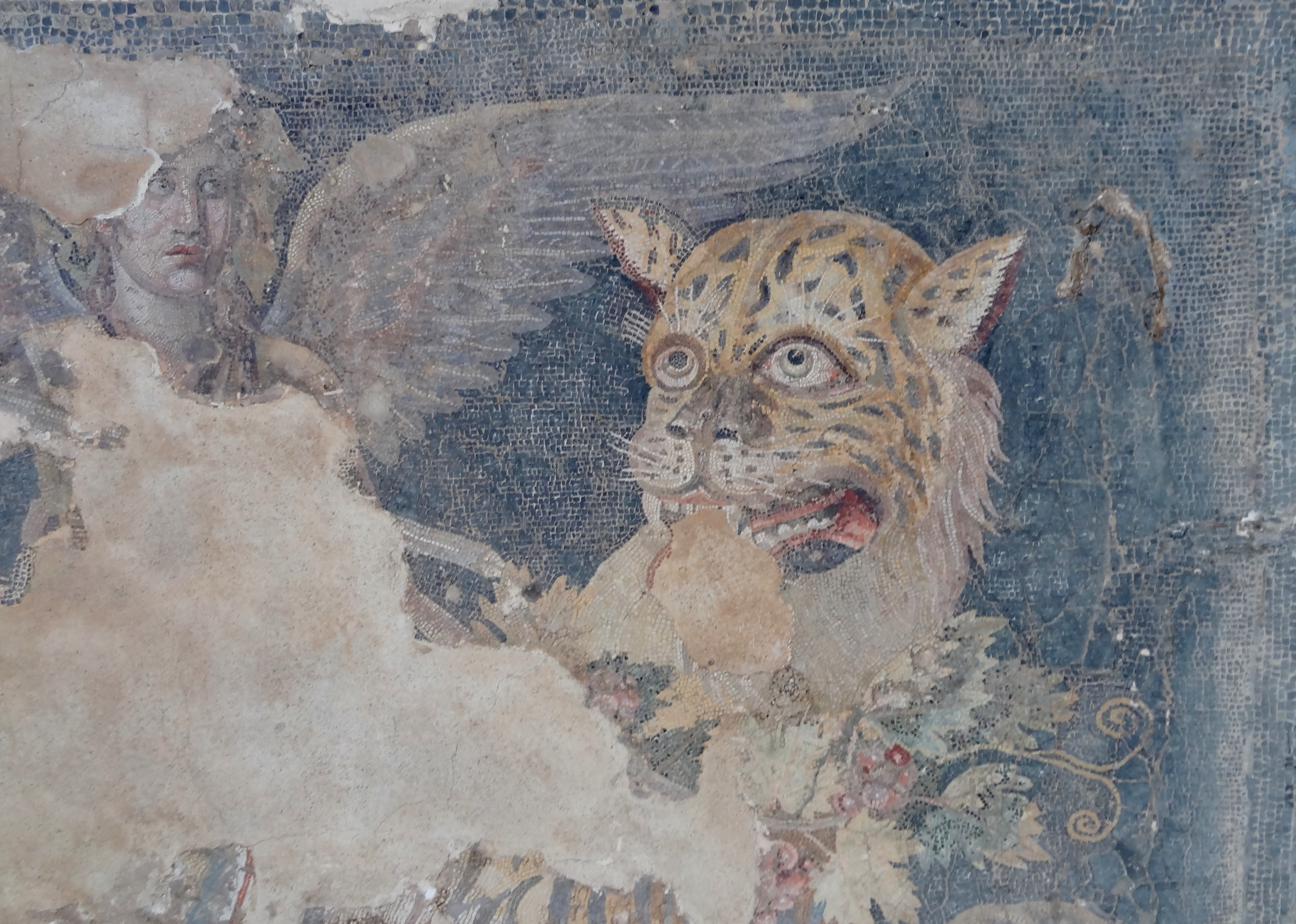
Close-up view and detail of the winged Dionysos and the tiger

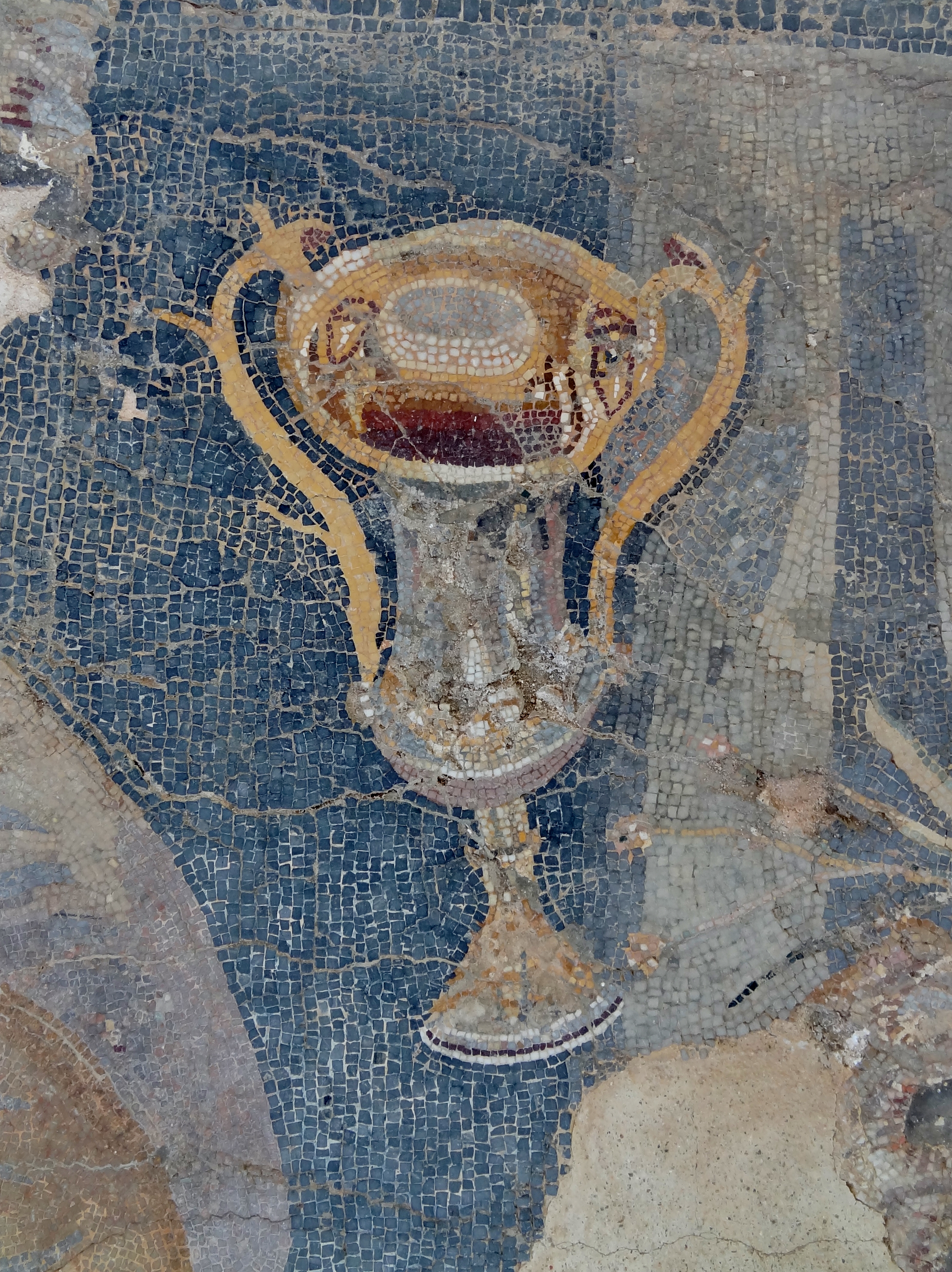
Detail of a Hellenistic glass vessel from the mosaic of Dionysos riding a tiger

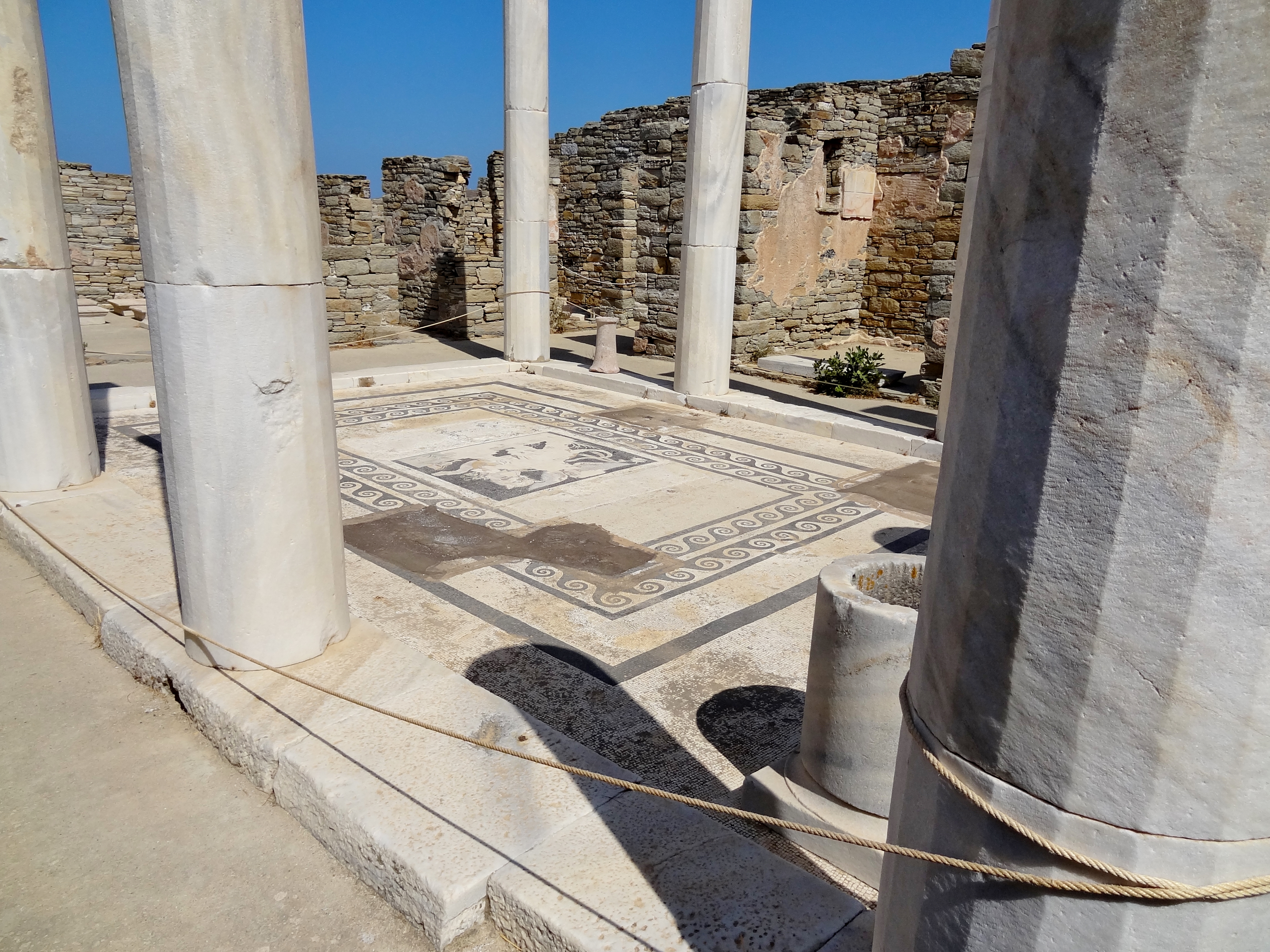
Floor mosaic in the peristyle hall of the House of Dionysos

=== House of the Masks ===
The House of the Masks is named after the mosaic motif of theatre masks decorating ivy scrolls arranged in strips around a central surface area decorated in a cubic pattern. The more intricately decorated mosaics are found in four different rooms branching off from the peristyle courtyard paved with marble chips, with corridor mosaics utilizing amphora fragments. In the center of one mosaic is the figure of Dionysos riding a leopard against a similar black background to the mosaic in the House of Dionysos. Another central mosaic features a flute player and a dancing figure, the latter perhaps representing Silenus. Only the Dionysos figure employs the vermiculatum method. The other mosaics of the house fail to achieve the naturalism of finer figure scenes and motifs, but they nevertheless demonstrate an attempt at mimicking their illusionist qualities with the tesselated technique.

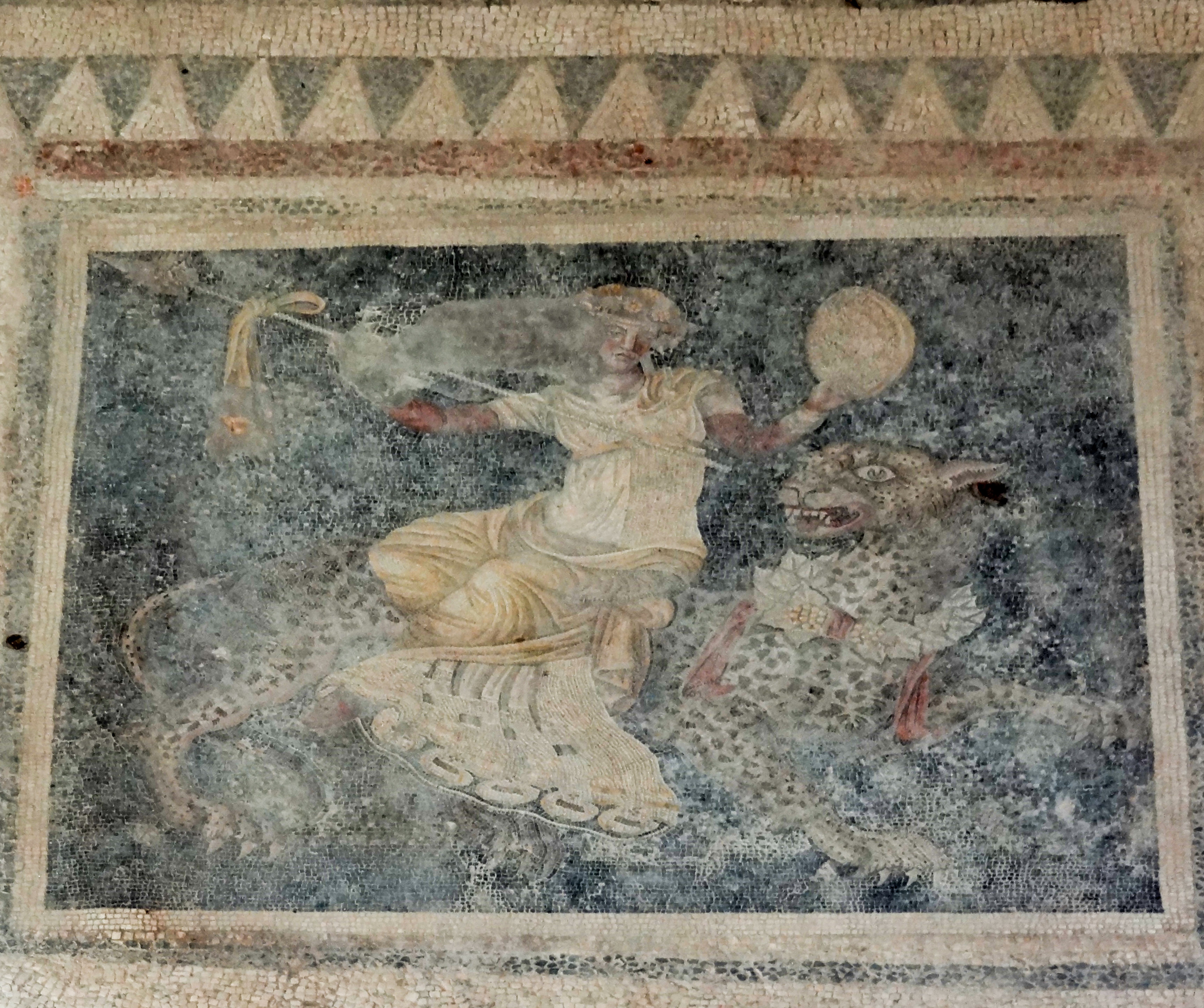
Dionysos riding on a feline creature

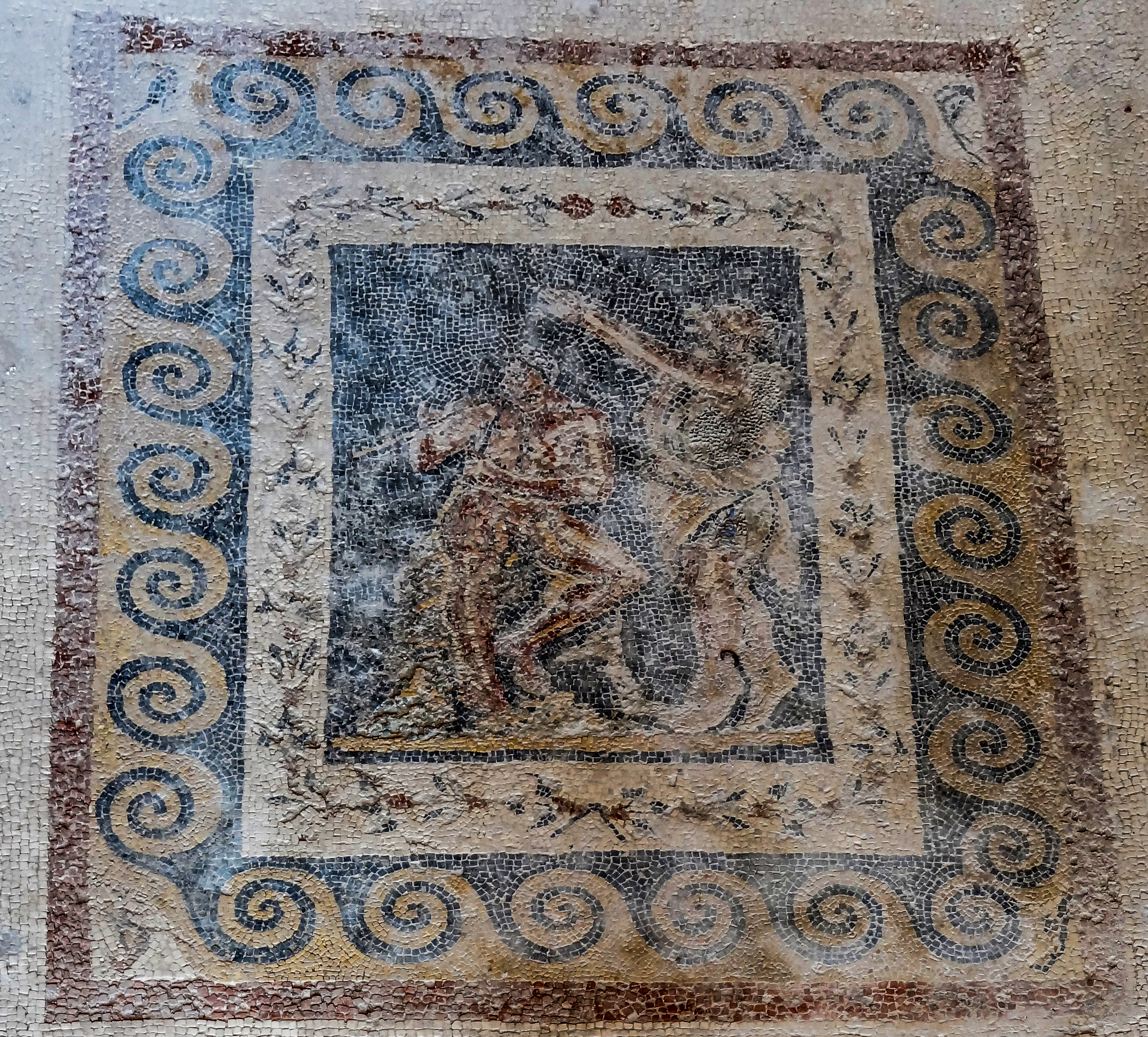
A silk-clad figure dancing to the tune of a flute player

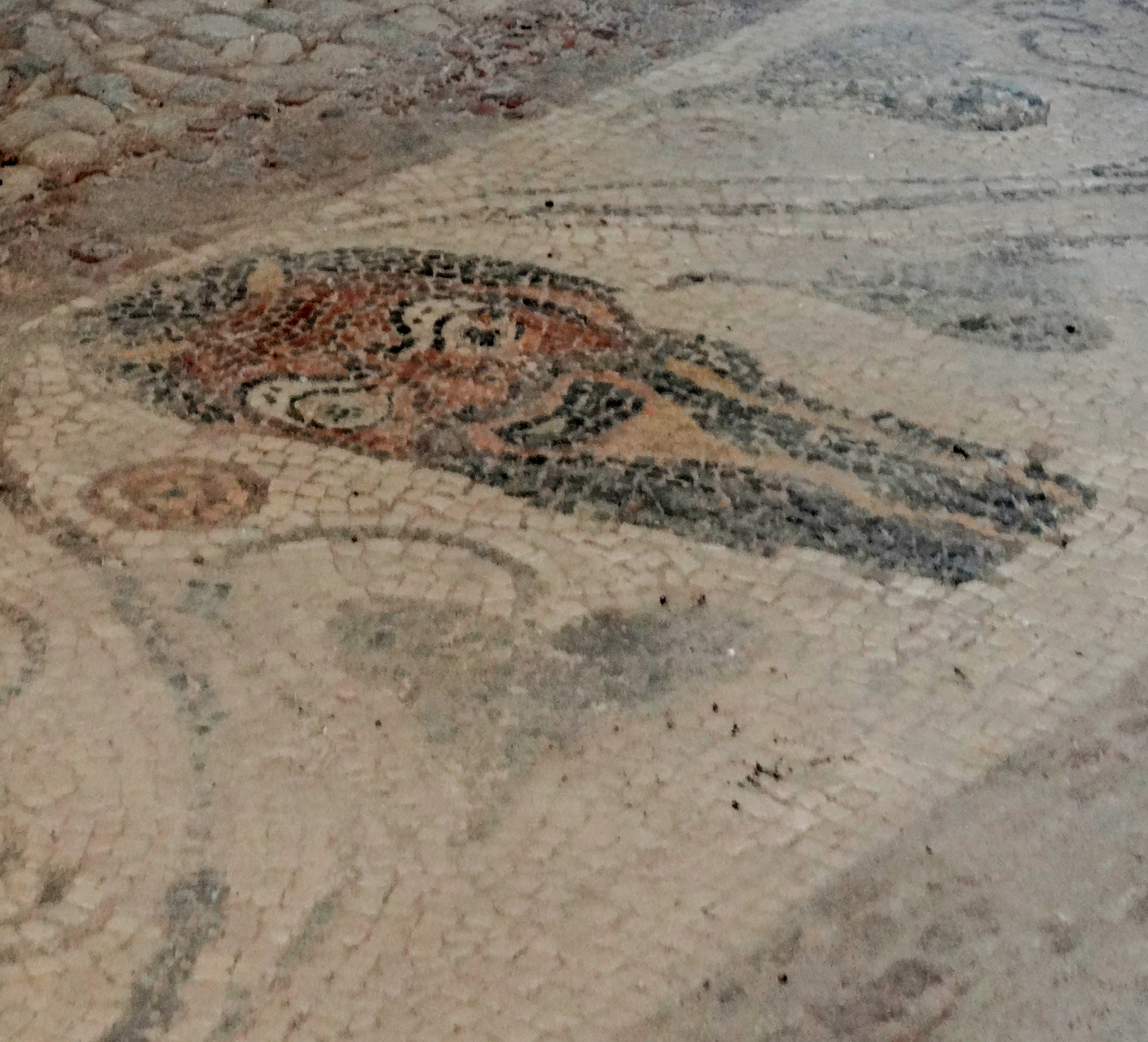
Mosaic of a theatre mask

=== House of the Dolphins ===
The House of the Dolphins contains a peristyle floor mosaic design that is unusual for Delos, with a circle enclosed by a square outline. In each corner of the square are pairs of dolphins ridden by tiny winged figures bearing the emblems of various Greek deities, namely the thyrsus, caduceus, trident, and one object that is missing due to damage. The circle contains a central rosette design surrounded by floral garlands and griffins. The mosaic, signed by a certain Asclepiades of Arados (in ancient Phoenicia, now western Syria), is one of only two examples from Delos that bear a signature of the original artist.

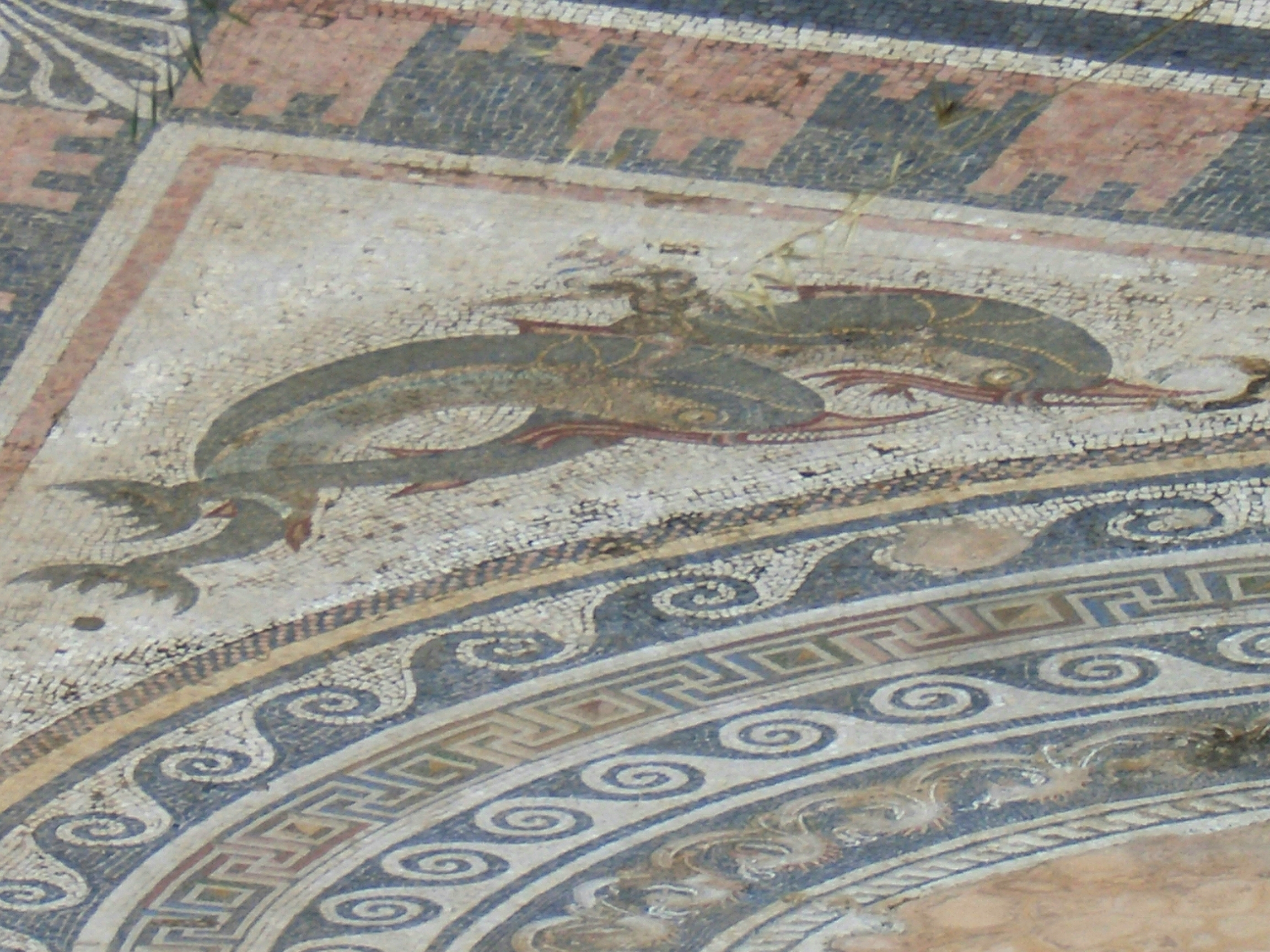
Dolphins and riders next to bands of single-wave-pattern motifs

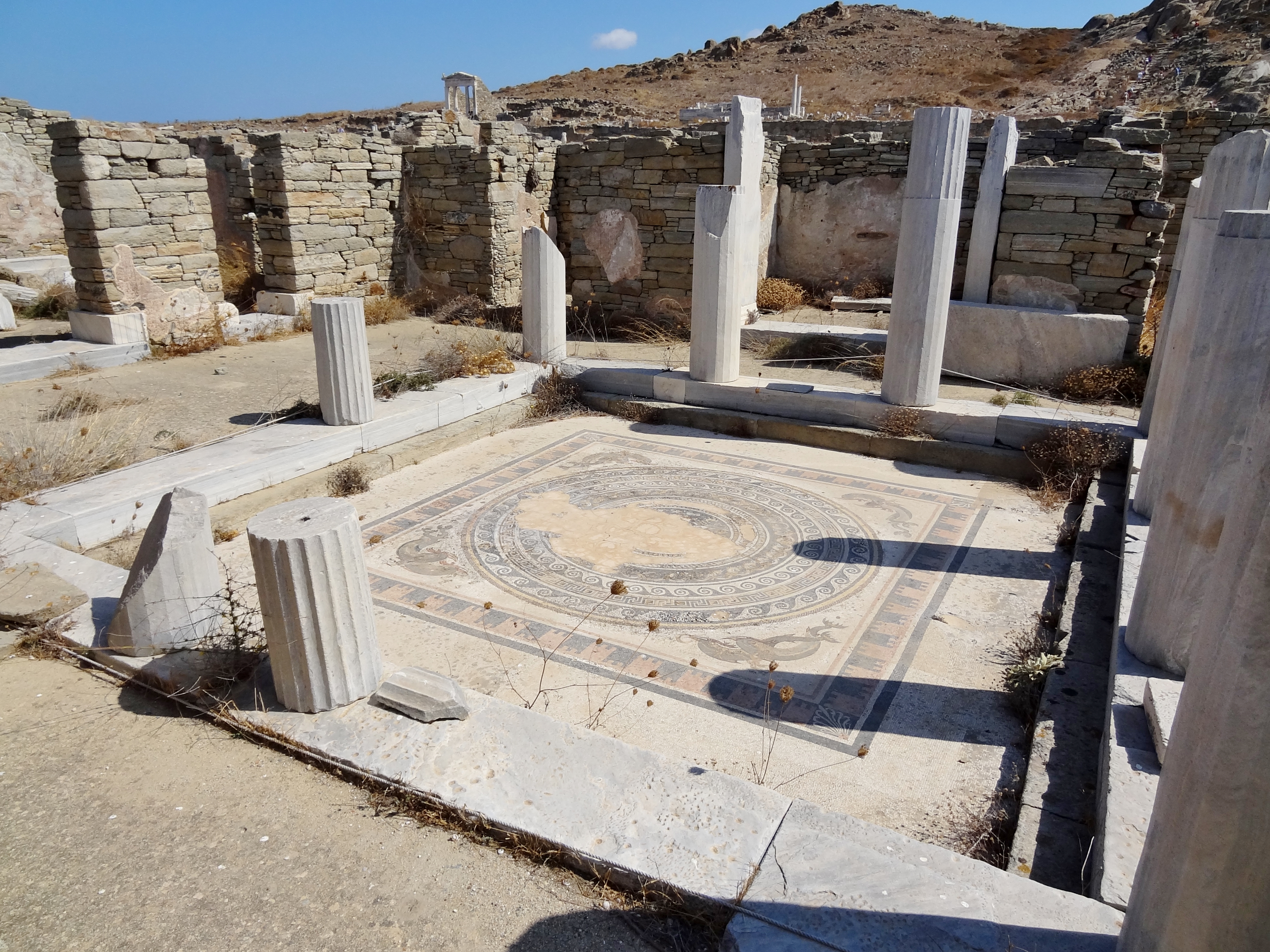
Peristyle courtyard flanked by columns that surround a mosaic floor

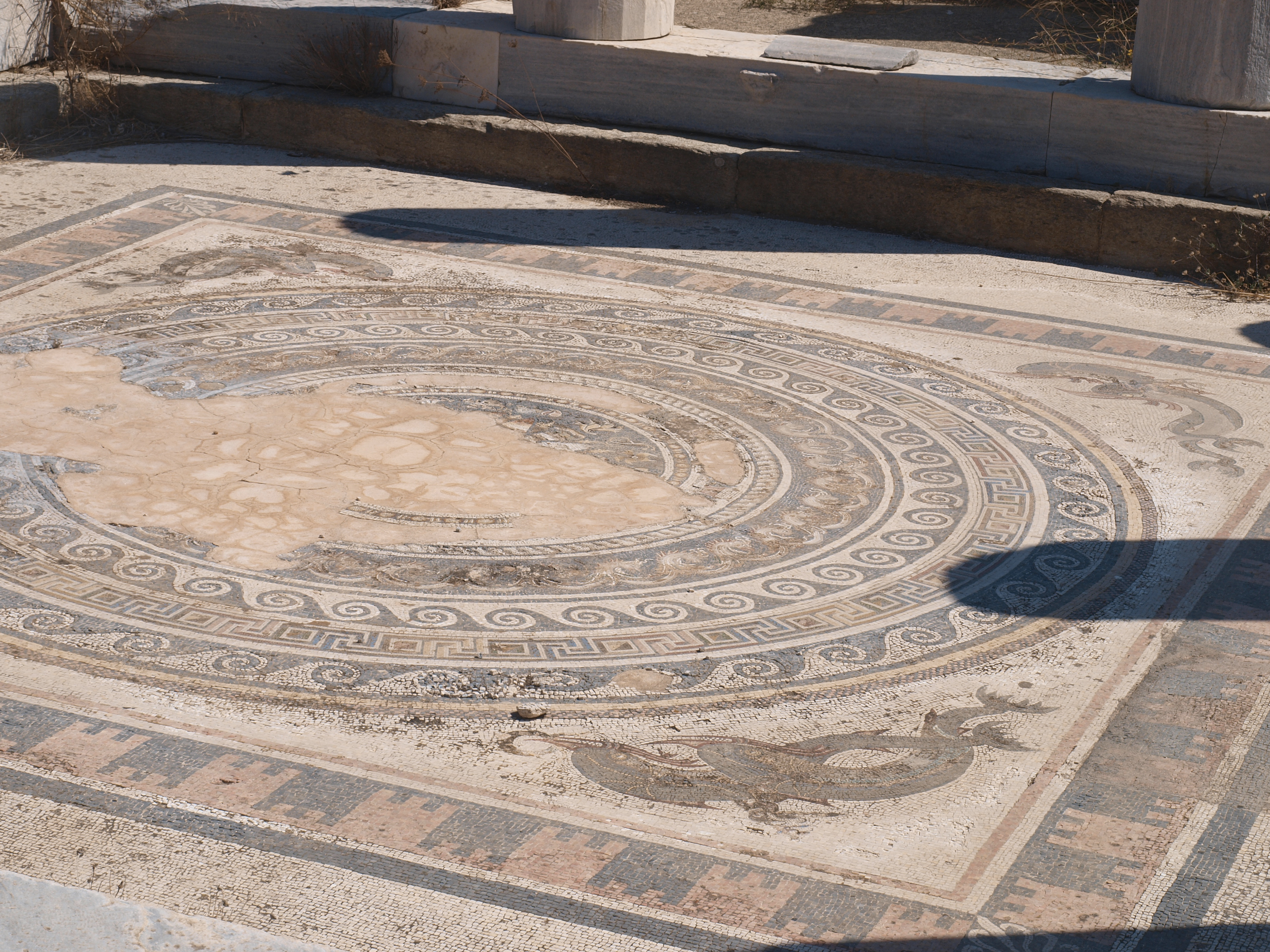
A close-up view of the floor mosaic containing a circle-within-a-square design

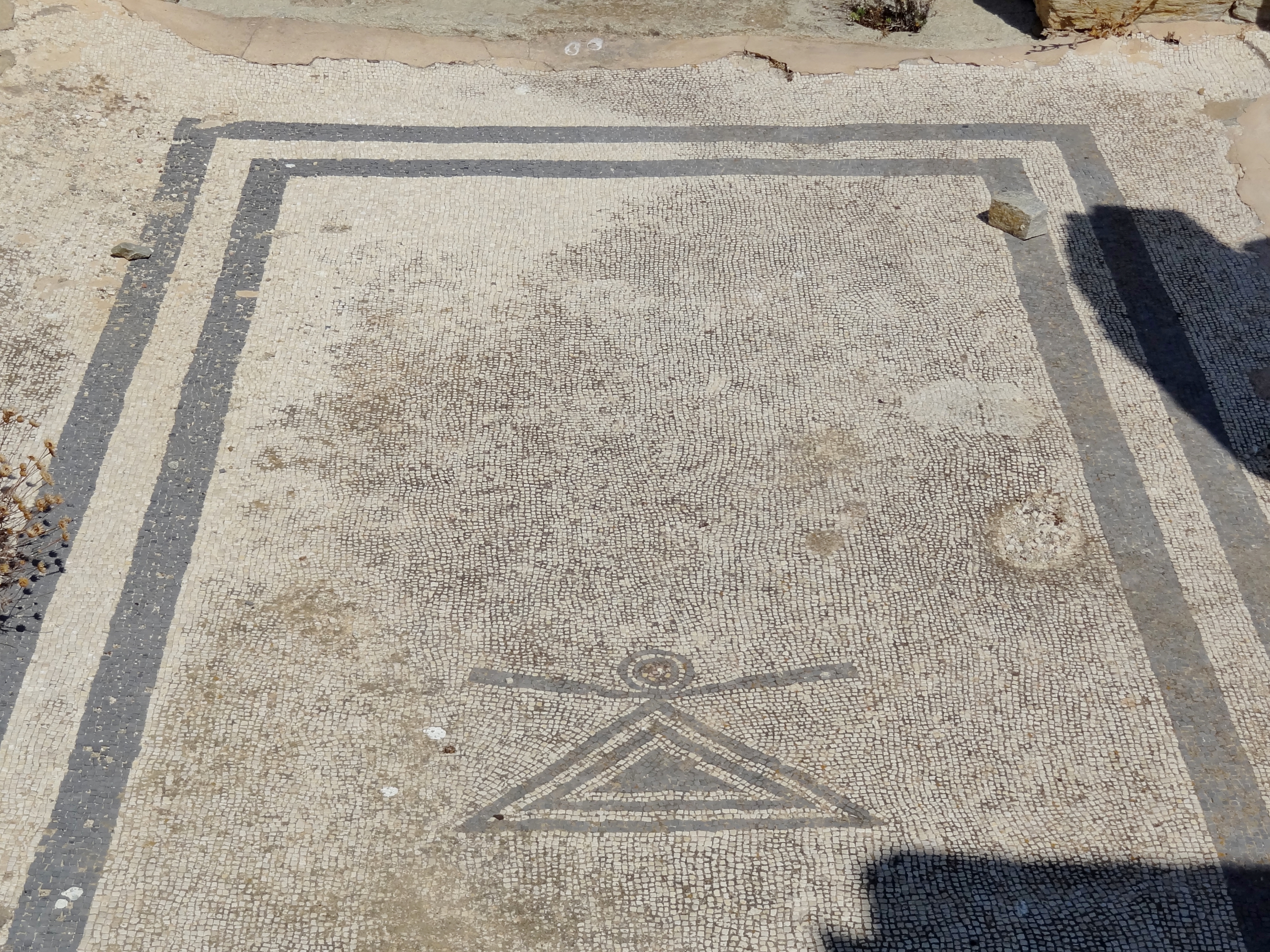
Mosaic with the symbol of the Punic–Phoenician goddess Tanit

=== House of the Lake ===
Similar to the design of the majority of Delian homes, the House of the Lake is an irregular-shaped home (as opposed to a rectangular or square floor plan), located near a sacred lake and inhabited from roughly 300 to 100 BC. The peristyle impluvium is decorated with a geometric-patterned motif around a central rosette, surrounded on all sides by monolithic columns in the Ionic style.

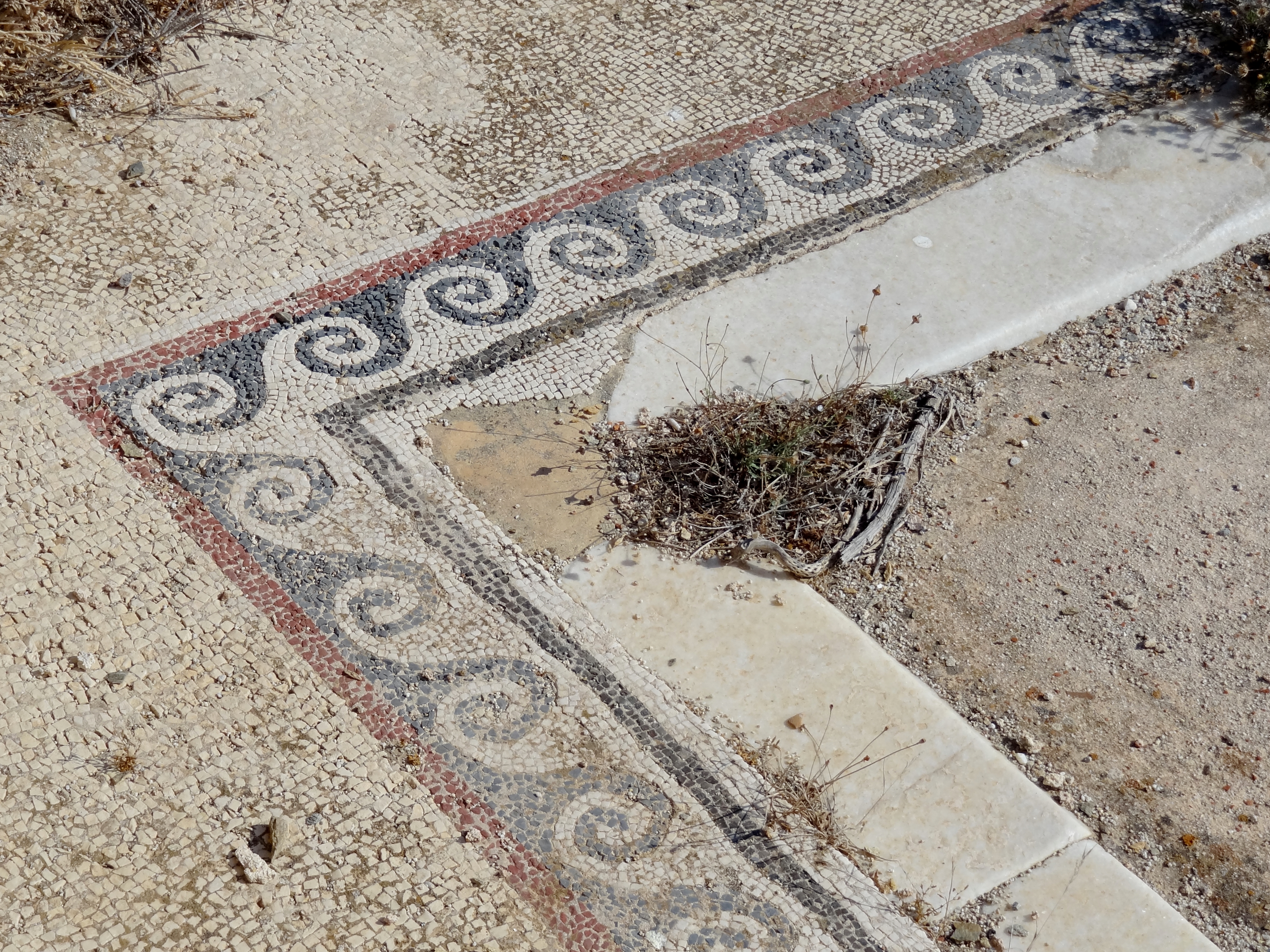
An example of the single-wave-patterned border

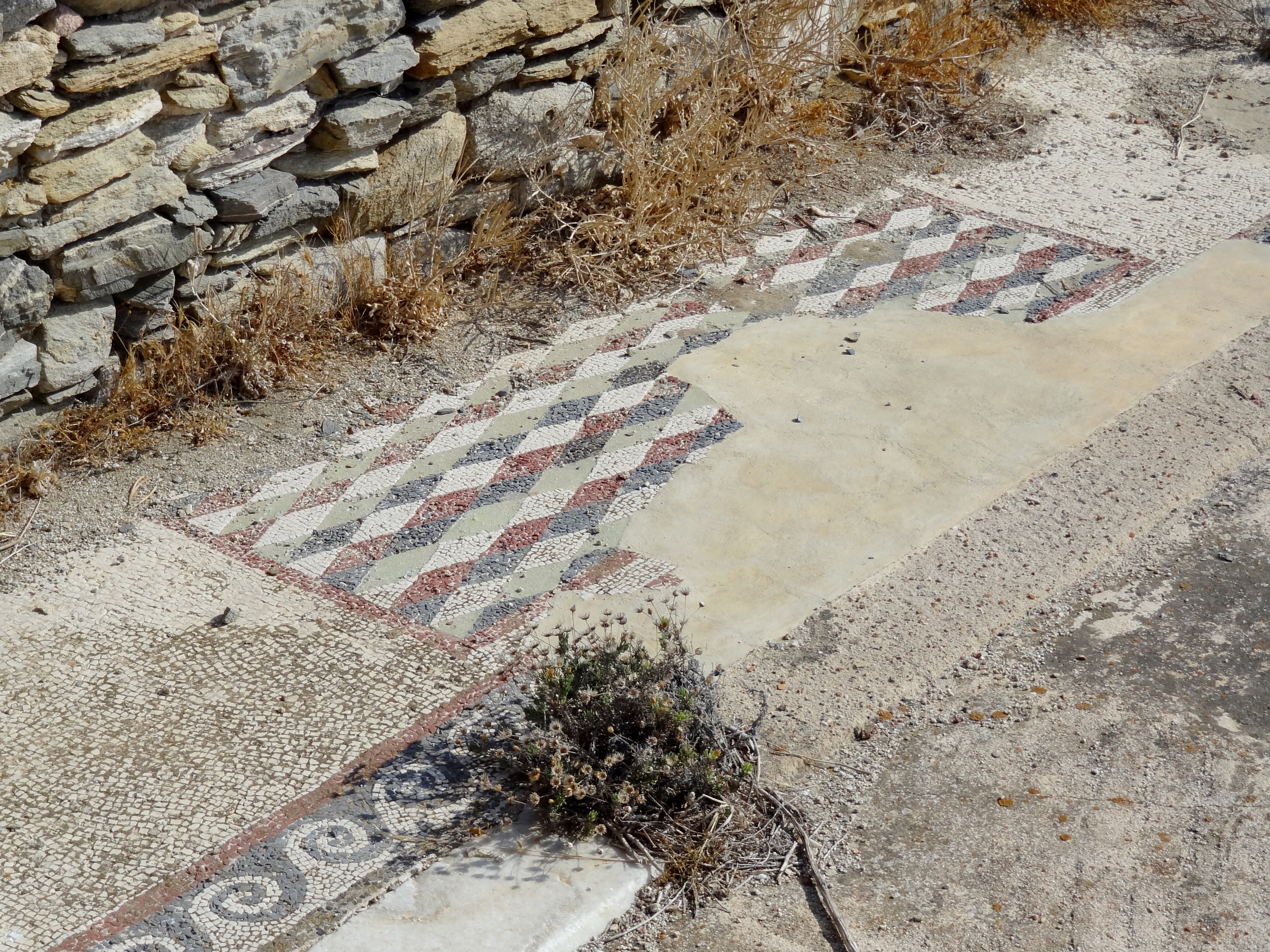
Cube-pattern mosaic with the single-wave border

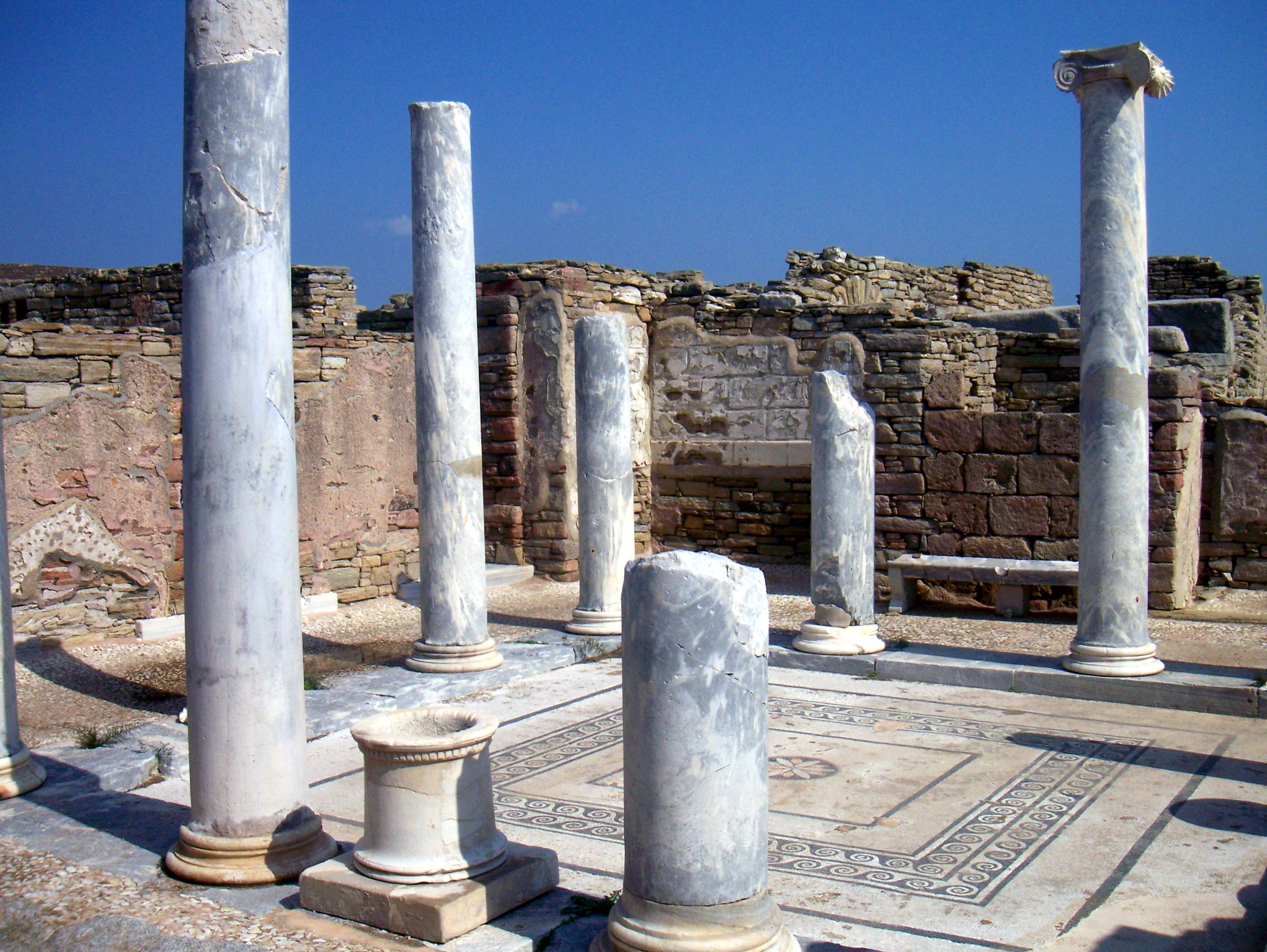
The peristyle impluvium with columns in the Ionic style and floor mosaic

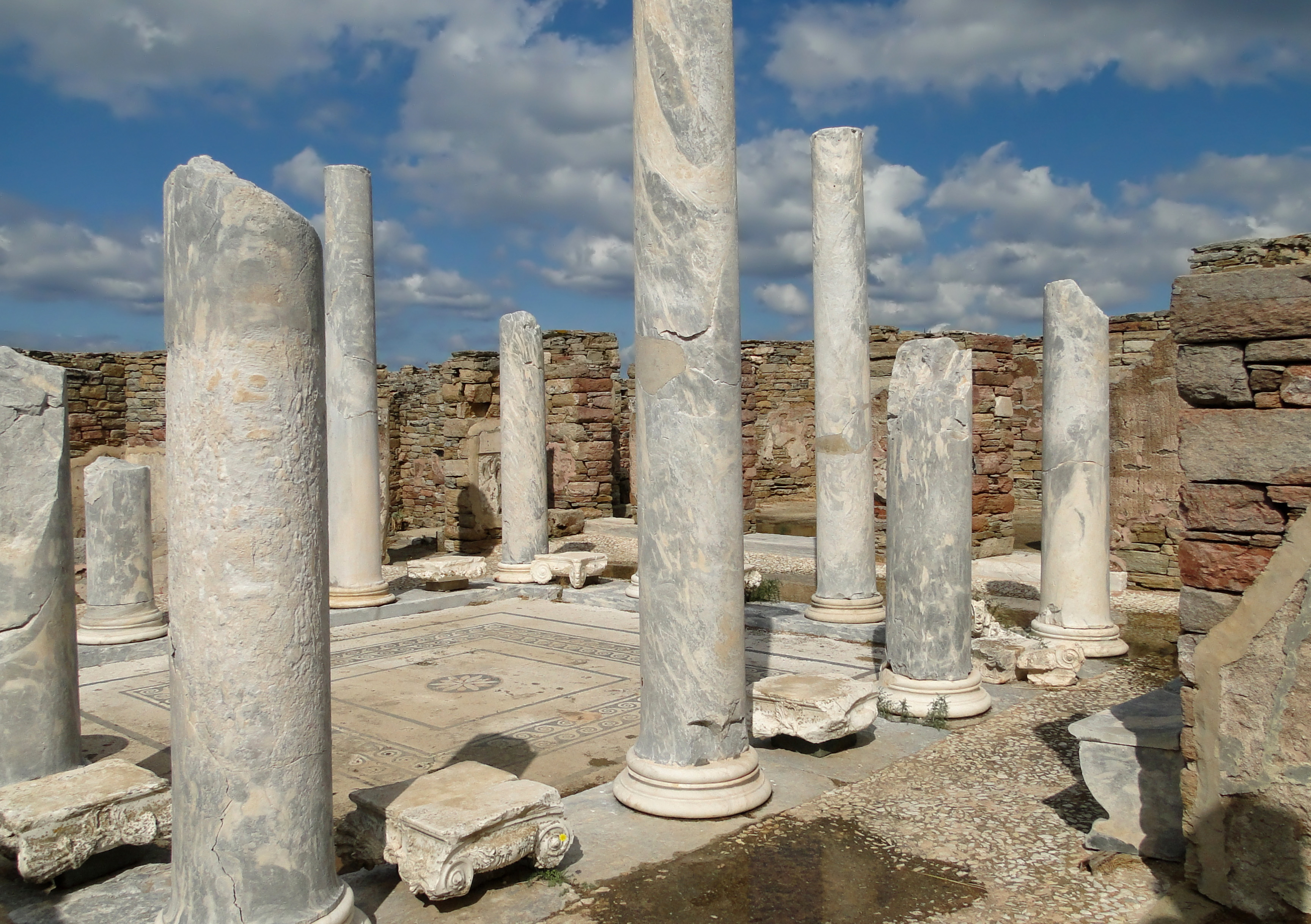
The impluvium and floor mosaic from another angle

=== House of the Trident ===
The House of the Trident contains peristyle panels with the motif of a black dolphin situated around a red anchor and black tridents against a white background. The theme suggests that the owners of the house were somehow connected to maritime pursuits. These simple, two-dimensional mosaics stand in contrast to the multicolored, finely detailed, three-dimensional Hellenistic mosaics of figures and motifs. They are perhaps comparable or even linked to the black-and-white pavement mosaics that appear in Roman Italy some decades later.

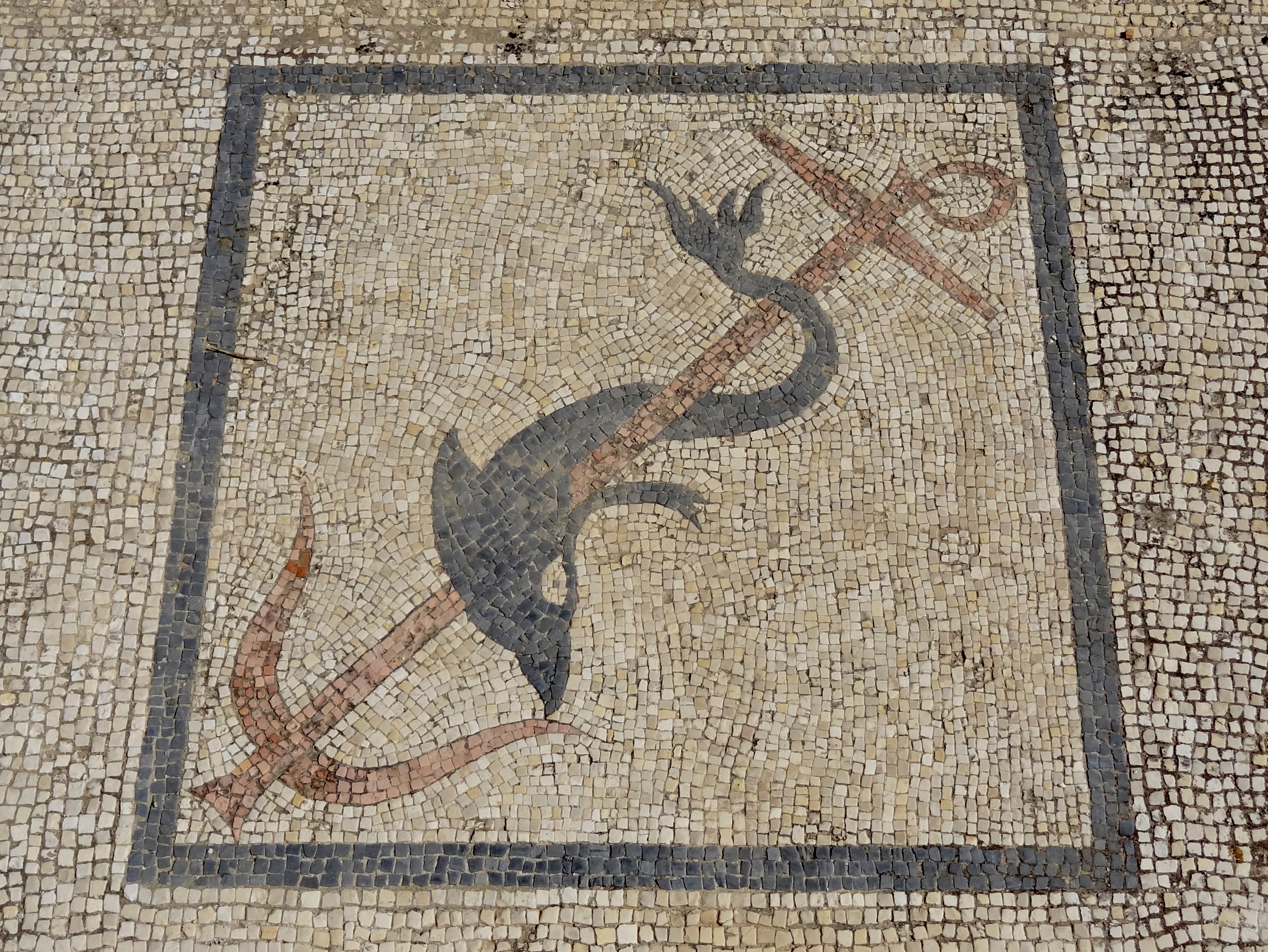
Mosaic decoration of a dolphin wrapped around an anchor

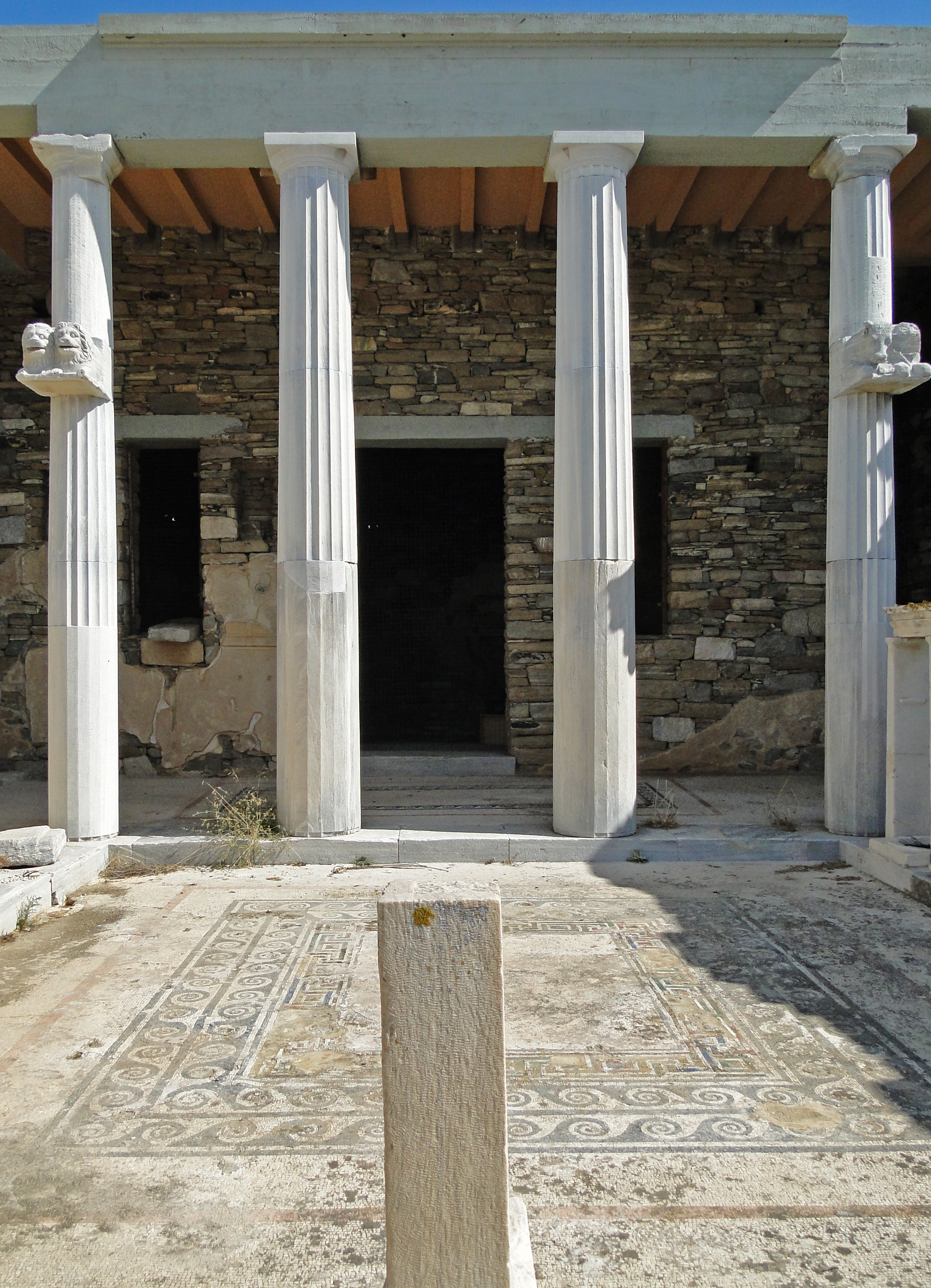
A view of the courtyard with the floor mosaic

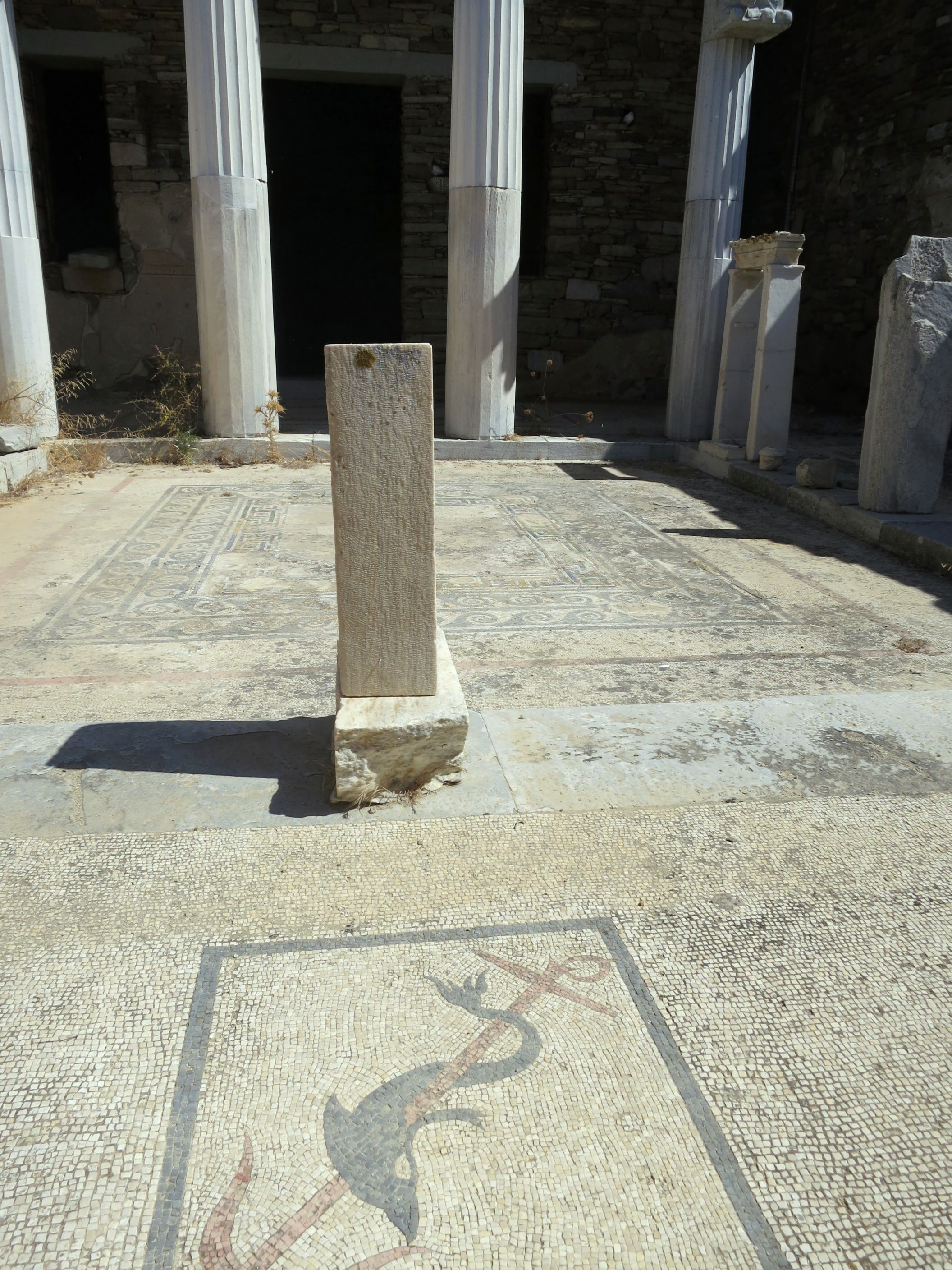
Another view of the courtyard and mosaic

== See also ==
- Archaeological Museum of Delos
- History of the Cyclades
- Byzantine mosaics
- Late Antique and medieval mosaics in Italy
- Zeugma Mosaic Museum
