= Lea Stirling =

Canadian classical scholar

Lea Margaret Stirling is a Canadian classical scholar and professor in the Department of Classics at the University of Manitoba. Her research focuses on Roman archaeology and Roman art with particular emphases on Roman sculpture, Late Antique art, and cemetery archaeology, and Roman North Africa.

== Career ==
Stirling completed her BA in classics at the University of Alberta (1988). She continued her studies as a graduate student at the University of Michigan, where she received her first master's degree (1990) in Roman archaeology, her second (1994) in Latin, and her PhD (1994) in Roman archaeology. She joined the faculty in the Department of Classics at the University of Manitoba in 1994 as an assistant professor, where she was promoted to associate professor in 2000 and professor in 2007. Between 1995 and 2008 she was a co-director of excavation at Leptiminus (modern Lemta). Stirling held a Canada Council Research Chair (Tier II) between 2001 and 2012. In the Fall of 2008, she was a visiting professor at the University of Aarhus, and a Margo Tytus Research Fellow at the University of Cincinnati in 2013–2014. She received the Terry G. Falconer Memorial Winnipeg Rh Institute Foundation Emerging Researcher Award (1998), the University of Manitoba's Award in Internationalization (2007), and has twice won the University of Manitoba's Outreach Award (1998 and 2009). Since 2000, Stirling has been selected as a National Touring Lecturer by the Archaeological Institute of America several times (most recently in 2006, 2007, 2014).

== Publications ==
=== Books ===
- Kristensen, T. M. and L. Stirling, eds. 2016. The Afterlife of Greek and Roman Sculpture: Late Antique Responses and Practices. Ann Arbor: University of Michigan Press.
- Stone, D. L. and L. M. Stirling, eds. 2007. Mortuary Landscapes of North Africa. Toronto: University of Toronto Press.
- Stirling, L. M. 2005. The Learned Collector: Mythological Statuettes and Classical Taste in Late Antique Gaul. Ann Arbor: University of Michigan Press.

=== Selected peer-reviewed articles and book chapters ===
- Stirling L.M. 2018. “From Mystery Masterpiece to Roman Artwork: The Journey of the Aspasia Statue Type in the Roman Empire.” In Roman Artists, Patrons, and Public Consumption: Familiar Works Reconsidered, edited by Brenda Longfellow and Ellen Perry, pp. 88–116. Ann Arbor: University of Michigan Press.
- Jacobs, I. and L. M. Stirling. 2017. “Re-using the gods. A 6th-c. statuary display at Sagalassos and a re-evaluation of pagan-mythological statuary in Early Byzantine civic space.” Journal of Roman Archaeology 30: 196–226.
- Kristensen, T. M. and L. M. Stirling. 2016. “The Lives and Afterlives of Roman Sculpture: From Use to Refuse.” In The Afterlife of Roman Sculpture: Late Antique Responses and Practices, ed. T. M. Kristensen and L. M. Stirling, 1-26. Ann Arbor: University of Michigan Press.
- Stirling, L. M. 2016. “Shifting Use of a Genre: A Comparison of Statuary Décor in Homes and Baths of the Late Roman West.” In The Afterlife of Roman Sculpture: Late Antique Responses and Practices, ed. T. M. Kristensen and L. M. Stirling, 265–289. Ann Arbor: University of Michigan Press.
- Stirling, L. M. 2015. “The Opportunistic Collector: Sources of Artwork for Collections in Late Antique Villas and Houses.” In Museum Archetypes and Collecting in the Ancient World, ed. M. Wellington Gahtan and D. Pagazzano, 137–145. Leiden, Boston: Brill.
- Stirling, L. M. 2014. “Collections, Canon, and Context in Late Antiquity: The Afterlife of Greek Masterpieces in Late Antiquity.” In Using Images in Late Antiquity, edited by S. Birk, T. M. Kristensen and B. Poulsen, 96–114. Oxford: Oxbow Books.
- Stirling, L. M. 2014. “Prolegomena to the Study of Portable Luxury Goods and Shared Aristocratic Culture in the Theodosian Age.” In Production and Prosperity in the Theodosian Age (Interdisciplinary Studies in Ancient Culture and Religion 14), edited by I. Jacobs, 191–213. Leuven: Peeters.
- Stirling, L. M. 2012. “Patrons, Viewers, and Statues in Late Antique Baths.” In Patrons and Viewers in Late Antiquity (Aarhus Studies in Mediterranean Antiquity vol. 10), edited by S. Birk and B. Poulsen, 67-81 Aarhus: Aarhus University Press.
- Stirling, L. M. 2012. “A New Portrait of Livia from Thysdrus (Lamta, Tunisia).” American Journal of Archaeology 116: 625–647.
- Stirling, L. M. 2008. “Pagan Statuettes in Late Antique Corinth: Sculpture from the Panayia Domus.” Hesperia 77: 89–161.
- Stirling, L. M. 2007. “The Koine of the Cupula in Roman North Africa and the Transition from Cremation to Inhumation.” In Mortuary Landscapes of North Africa, D. L. Stone and L. M. Stirling, eds. Toronto: University of Toronto Press: 110–137.
- Stone, D. L. and L. M. Stirling, 2007. “Funerary Monuments and Mortuary Practices in the Landscapes of North Africa.” In Mortuary Landscapes of North Africa, D. L. Stone and L. M. Stirling, eds. Toronto: University of Toronto Press: 3-31.
- Ben Lazreg, N., S. Stevens, L. Stirling, and J. P. Moore. 2006. “Roman and Early Christian Burial Complex at Leptiminus (Lamta): second notice.” Journal of Roman Archaeology 19: 347–368.
- Sherriff, B. L., C. McCammon, and L. Stirling. 2002. “A Mössbauer Study of the Colour of Roman Pottery from the Leptiminus Archaeological Site, Tunisia.” Geoarchaeology 17.8: 863–74.
- Sherriff, B. L., P. Court, S. Johnston, and L. Stirling. 2002. “The Source of Raw Materials for Roman Pottery from Leptiminus, Tunisia.” Geoarchaeology 17.8: 835–61.
- Stirling, L. M. 2001. “A Classical Sculpture in the Winnipeg Art Gallery.” Antike Kunst 44: 13–17.
- Stone, D. L., L. M. Stirling, and N. Ben Lazreg. 1998. “Suburban Land-Use and Ceramic Production around Leptiminus: Interim Report.” Journal of Roman Archaeology 11: 304–17.
- Stirling, L. M. 1997. “Late-Antique Goddesses and Other Statuary at the Villa of La-Garenne-de-Nérac.” Echos du Monde Classique 41: 149–76.
- Stirling, L. M. 1996. “Gods, Heroes, and Ancestors: Sculptural Decoration in Late-Antique Aquitania.” Aquitania 14: 209–30.
- Stirling, L. M. 1996. “Divinities and Heroes in the Age of Ausonius: A Late-Antique Villa and Sculptural Collection at Saint-Georges-de-Montagne (Gironde).” Revue Archéologique: 103–43.
