= Roman mosaic =

Style of mosaic from the Roman period

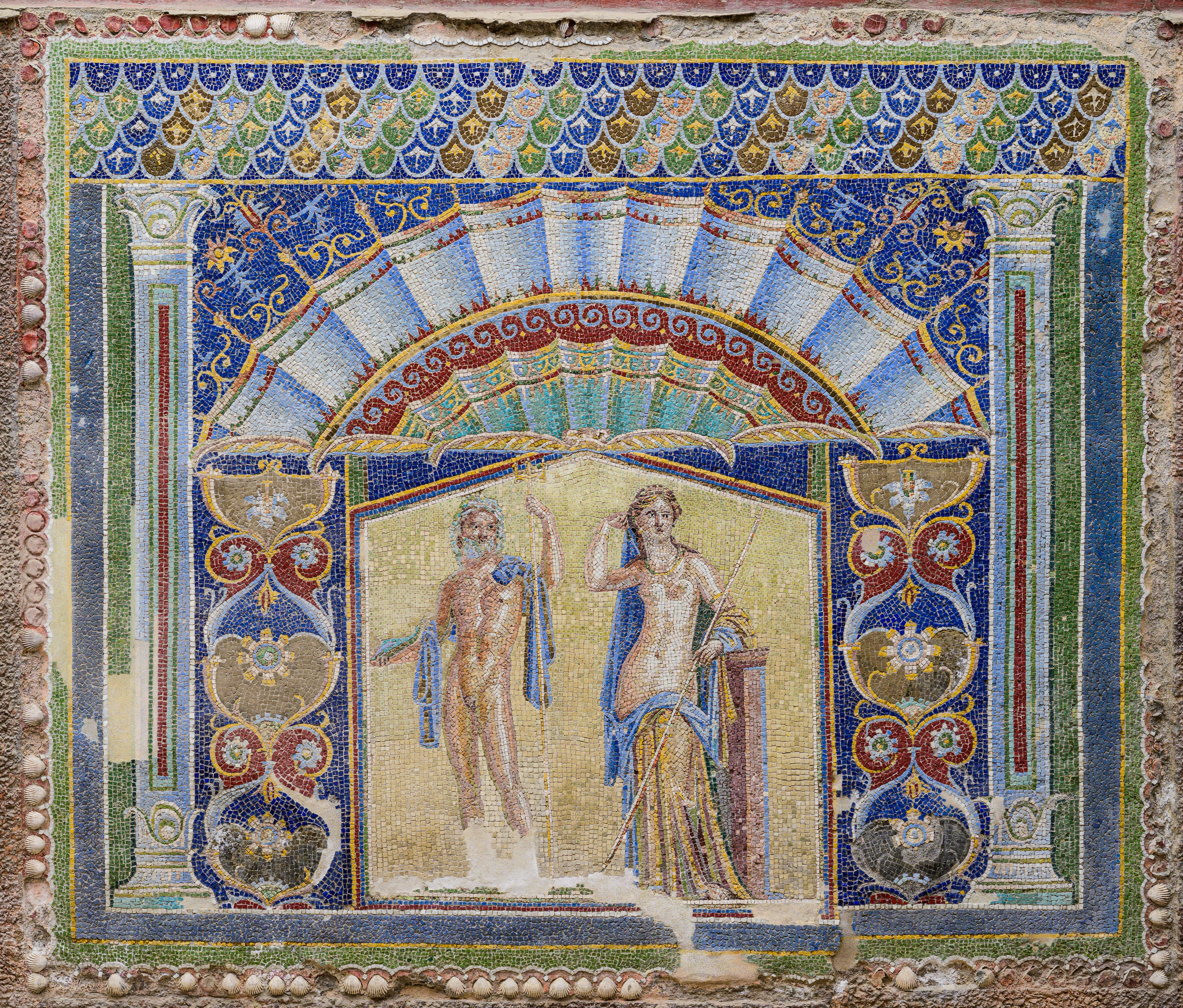
Mosaic of Neptune and Amphitrite, House of Neptune and Amphitrite, Herculaneum, Italy, 1st century AD

A Roman mosaic is a mosaic made during the Roman period, throughout the Roman Republic and later Empire. Mosaics were used in a variety of private and public buildings, on both floors and walls, though they competed with cheaper frescos for the latter. They were highly influenced by earlier and contemporary Hellenistic Greek mosaics, and often included famous figures from history and mythology, such as Alexander the Great in the Alexander Mosaic.

A large proportion of the surviving examples of wall mosaics come from Italian sites such as Pompeii and Herculaneum. Otherwise, floor mosaics are far more likely to have survived, with many coming from the fringes of the Roman Empire. The Bardo National Museum in Tunis has an especially large collection from large villas in modern Tunisia.

== Development ==
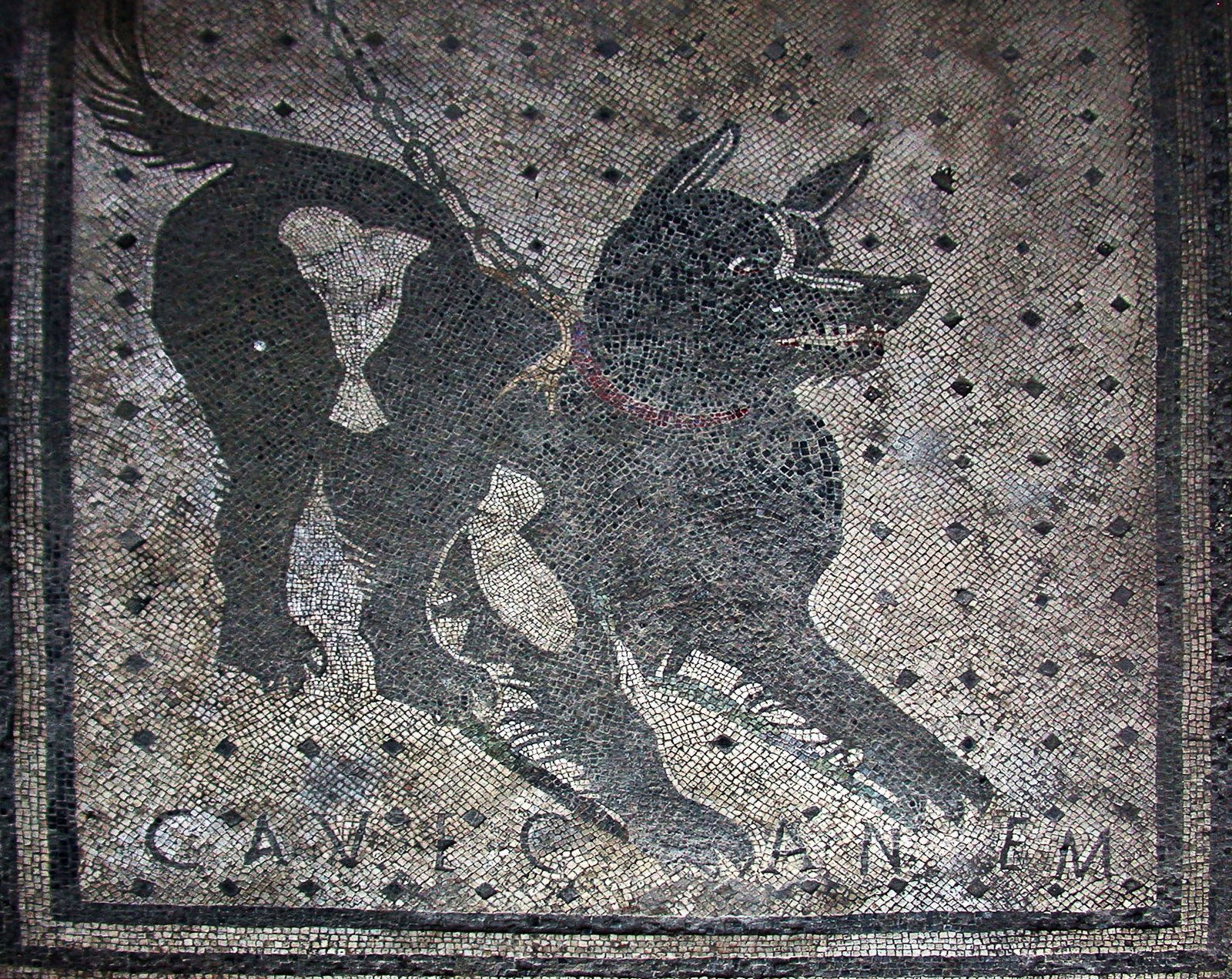
A Roman mosaic inscribed with the Latin phrase cave canem ("beware of the dog"), from the House of the Tragic Poet in Pompeii, Italy, 2nd century BC

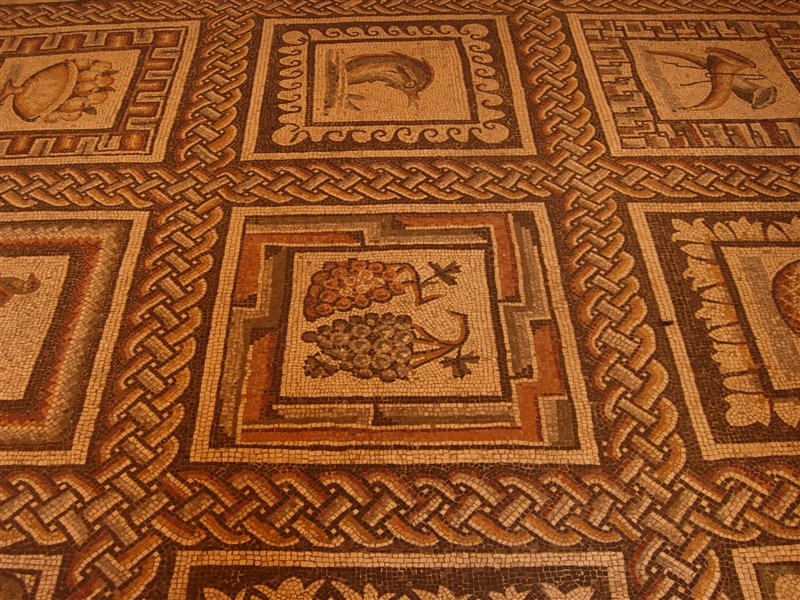
Mosaic with Xenia, 4th century AD, Pius Clementine museum, Vatican Museums

Perhaps the earliest examples of Greco-Roman mosaic floors date to the late Republican period (2nd century BC) and are from Delos, Greece. Witts claims that tessellated pavements, using tesserae, were used in Europe from the late fifth to early fourth centuries BC. This is contradicted by Ruth Westgate, who contends that the earliest tessellated mosaics of the Hellenistic period date to the 3rd century BC, with the 2nd to early 1st-century BC mosaics of Delos constituting roughly half of the known examples. Hetty Joyce and Katherine M. D. Dunbabin concur with this assessment, asserting that the transition from pebble mosaics to more complex tessellated mosaics originated in Hellenistic-Greek Sicily during the 3rd century BC, developed at sites such as Morgantina and Syracuse. The earliest known pebble mosaics and use of chip pavement are found at Olynthus in Greece's Chalcidice, dated to the 5th to 4th centuries BC, while other examples can be found at Pella, capital of Macedon, dated to the 4th century BC.

The earliest mosaics of Roman Pompeii, dated to the Pompeian First Style of wall painting in the late 2nd and early 1st centuries BC, were clearly derived from the Hellenistic Greek model. However, they contained far more figured scenes on average, less abstract design, the absence of lead strips, as well as an almost complete lack of complex, three-dimensional scenes utilizing polychromy until the Pompeian Second Style of wall painting (80–20 BC).

The mosaics in the Villa Romana del Casale (c. 300 AD) from Roman Sicily perhaps represent the hallmark of mosaic art in the Late Imperial period. The mosaic decoration of the local palace complex culminates in the gallery, which contains a scene of animal hunting and fighting covering an area of 3,200 square feet (300 m^{2}).

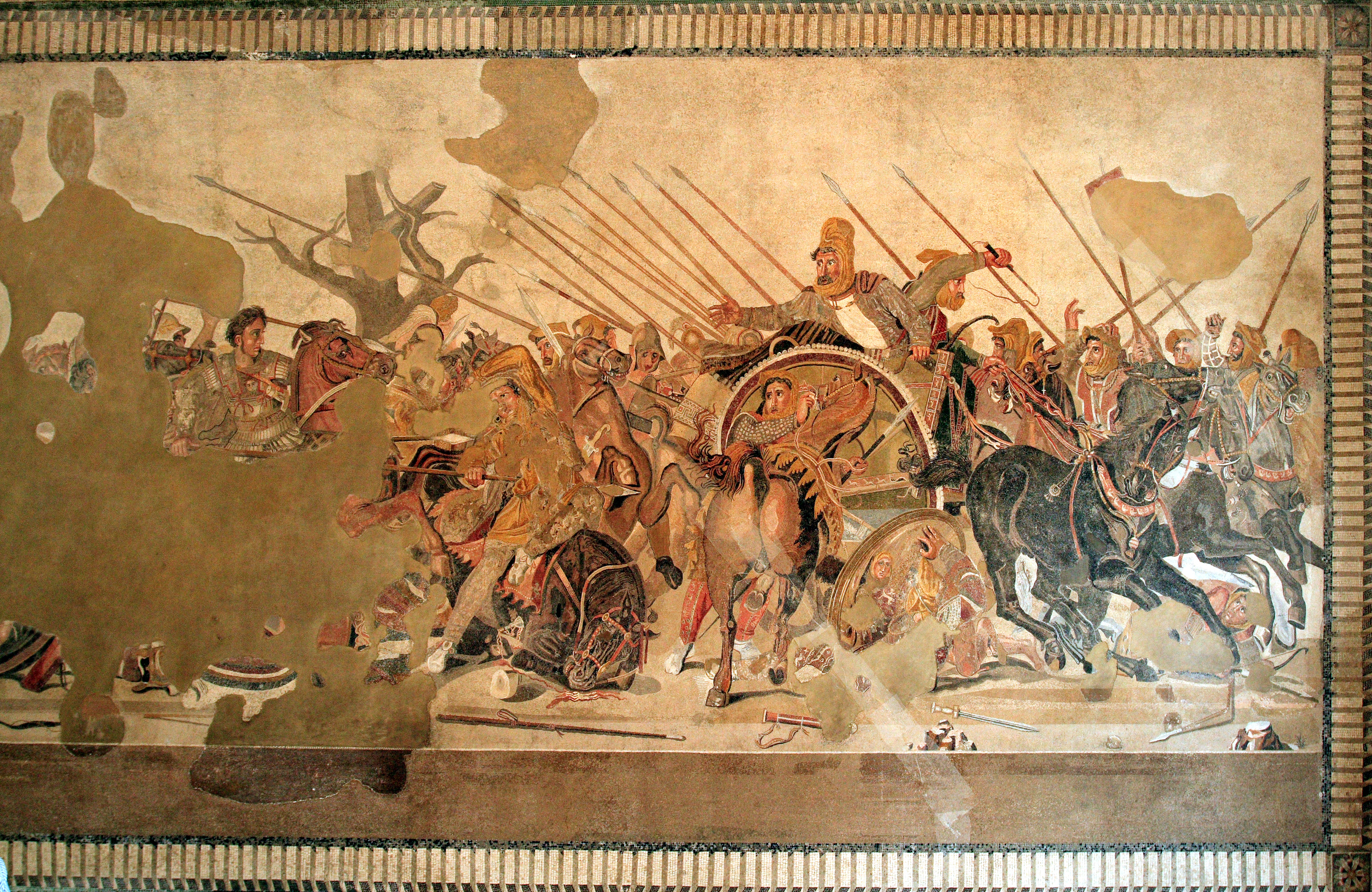
The Alexander Mosaic from Pompeii, ca. 100 BC

== Technology ==
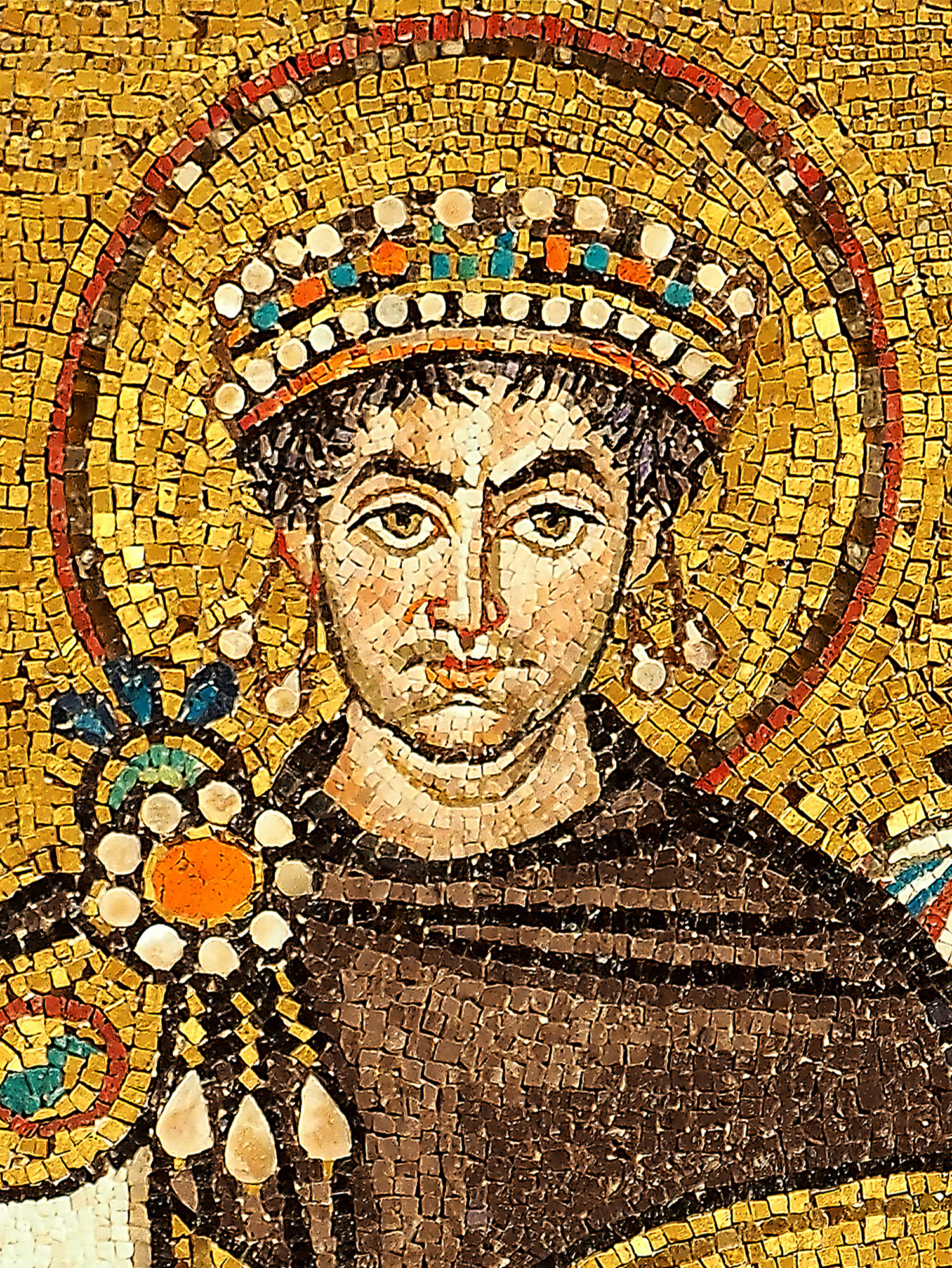
Mosaic of Eastern Roman emperor Justinian I, 6th century

Roman mosaics are constructed from geometrical blocks called tesserae, placed together to create the shapes of figures, motifs and patterns. Materials for tesserae were obtained from local sources of natural stone, with the additions of cut brick, tile and pottery creating coloured shades of, predominantly, blue, black, red, white and yellow. Polychrome patterns were most common, but monochrome examples are known. Marble and glass were occasionally used as tesserae, as were small pebbles, and precious metals like gold.

Mosaic decoration was not just confined to floors but featured on walls and vaults as well. Traces of guidelines have been found beneath some mosaics, either scored into or painted onto the mortar bedding. The design might also be pegged out in string, or mounted in a wooden frame.

The collapse of buildings in antiquity can, paradoxically, both irrevocably destroy mosaics or protect and preserve them.

== Imagery ==
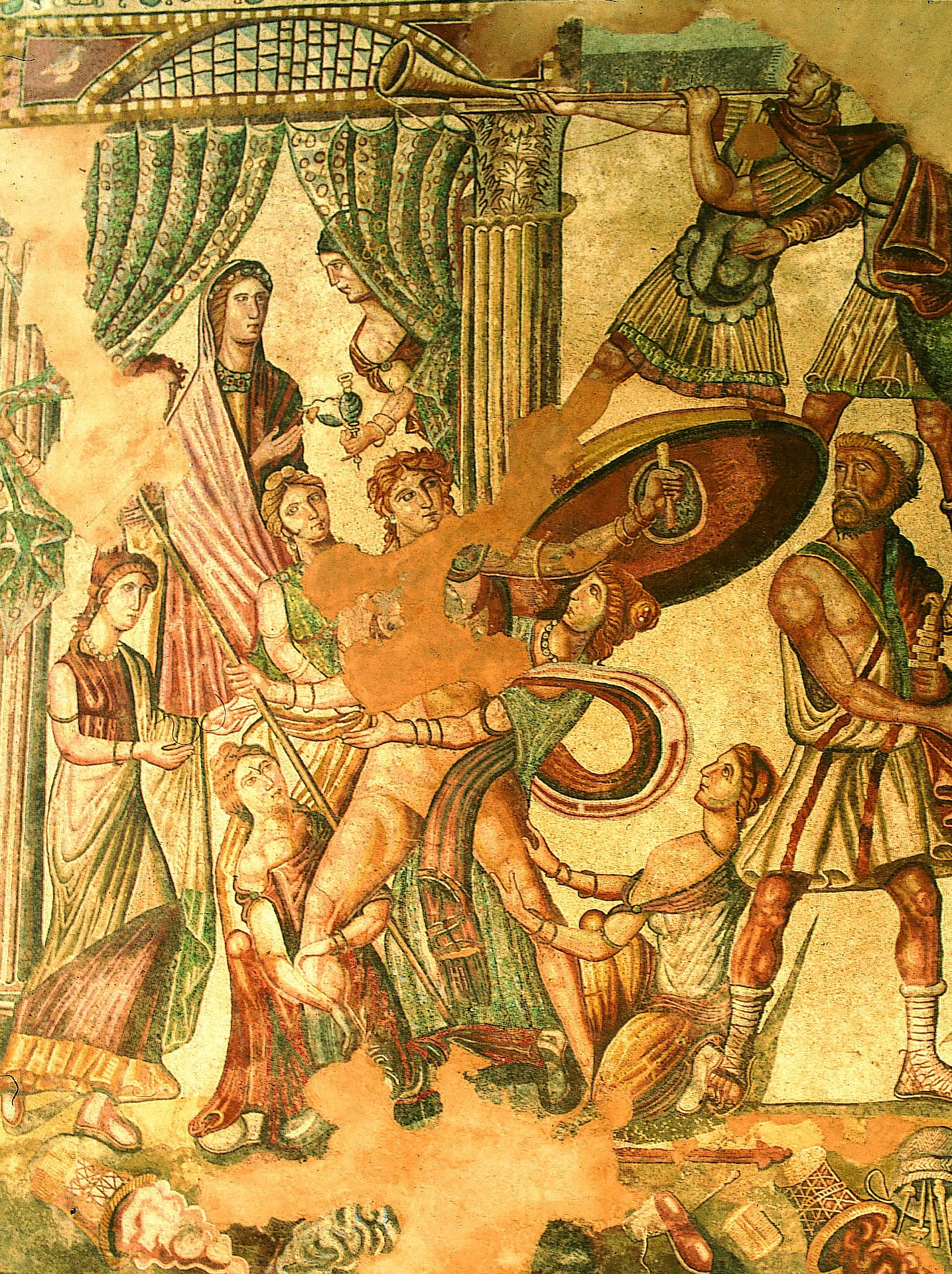
Achilles being adored by princesses of Skyros, a scene from the Iliad where Odysseus (Ulysses) discovers him dressed as a woman and hiding among the princesses at the royal court of Skyros. A late Roman mosaic from La Olmeda, Spain, 4th-5th centuries AD

Roman mosaics frequently depicted religious figures, theatrical scenes, mythological stories, geometric labyrinth patterns, and other decorative designs.

=== Portraits ===
Imagery of famous individuals or entertaining scenes are common on Roman mosaics. The Alexander Mosaic from the House of the Faun, Pompeii depicts the Battle of Issus between Alexander the Great and Darius III. In addition to famous people from antiquity, mosaics can depict aspects of daily life. The Gladiator Mosaic from Rome depicts a fighting scene, naming each gladiator involved. A gladiatorial scene is also known from Leptis Magna.

Roman portrait mosaics, as well as Roman portraits in general, often depicted men and women with similar physical features or attire. This practice became especially commonplace during the Imperial Period and dates back to as early as 18 BC. There is evidence for this in a series of Denarii (Roman silver coins), which portray the goddess Virtus with recognizable Augustan features.

=== Geometric Mosaics ===
One common type of Roman mosaics are geometric mosaics, which there is evidence for all across the Roman Empire. Geometric mosaics are often made up of intricate patterns in the style of mazes or labyrinths. There are 57 known floor mosaics in the style of labyrinths, and the majority of them are found in private homes or bathhouses. All 57 were catalogued in 1977 by German archaeologist, Wiktor Daszewski. Scholar Rebecca Molholt discusses the reasoning behind why so many of the known maze mosaics were found in bathhouses. Maze mosaics were believed to have apotropaic powers and this is reflected in many mosaics which incorporate scenes of mythical creatures or stories. Furthermore, labyrinth mosaics were considered to be bearers of good luck for those who could successfully make their way through the maze. On their way to bathe, athletes likely would walk through these mazes on their way to bathe in preparation for competition. The experience of walking along the labyrinth pattern would have likely heightened the senses, as the participants would be acutely aware of their feet along the mosaic on the floor.

=== Religion ===
One of the earliest examples of Early Christian art in mosaic is the early 4th-century floor mosaic from a villa at Hinton St Mary, Dorset, England, which shows Christ with a Chi-Rho behind his head. The mosaic is now in the British Museum. Orpheus mosaics, which often include many animals drawn by the god's playing, are very common; he was also used in Early Christian art as a symbol for Christ. Scenes of Dionysus are another common subject.

As the Roman period merged into Late Antiquity, wall mosaics became the dominant form of art in grand churches, and the gold-ground style became usual. Italy has a high proportion of the surviving examples.

=== Emblems ===
Progression within the mosaic technique developed the emblem, the "heart" of all mosaics. The word emblem is used to describe a small mosaic featuring a little genre scene or still life, characterised by particularly thin tesserae made separately and mounted in a central or important position in the main panel.

== Recent finds ==
=== 2020 ===
In May 2020, the discovery of a well-preserved Roman mosaic floor dating to the 3rd century AD buried underneath a vineyard at Negrar is reported after about a century of searching the site of a long-lost villa.

=== 2022 ===
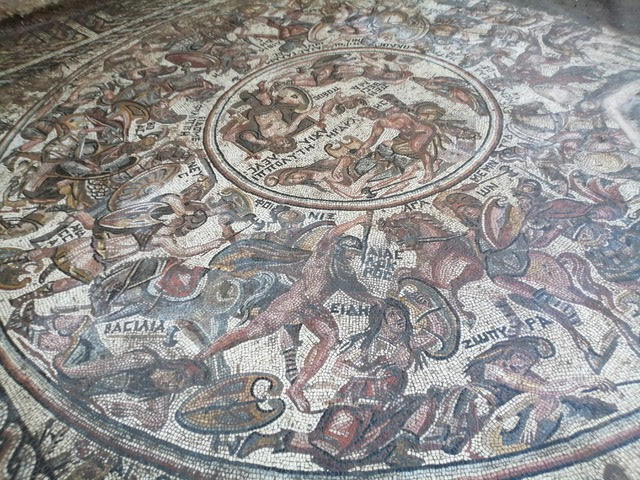
Mosaic discovered in Al-Rastan, Syria

In October 2022, a 1,600-year-old intact Roman mosaic measuring 20 x 6 metres was found under a building in Al-Rastan, a city near Homs in Syria that was held by rebels until 2018. The building was being excavated by Syria's General Directorate of Antiquities and Museums, and was donated by the Lebanese Nabu Museum to the Syrian state. At the time of excavation, it was unclear whether the building which housed the mosaic was a public bathhouse or something else. The mosaic showed mythical scenes including portraying the Roman sea god Neptune and 40 of his mistresses, as well as Hercules slaying the Amazon queen Hippolyta.

== Notable examples ==
- The Alexander Mosaic from the House of the Faun, Pompeii
- The Tomb of the Julii in the Vatican Necropolis, beneath St. Peter's Basilica, Rome
- The Gladiator Mosaic from the Via Casilina outside Rome
- The Zliten Mosaic from Zliten in Libya
- The "Gypsy Girl" from Gaziantep, Turkey
- The mosaic floors of the Villa Romana del Casale, in Piazza Armerina, Sicily
- The Lod Mosaic from Lod, Israel
- The Plato's Academy mosaic, Pompeii

== Gallery ==
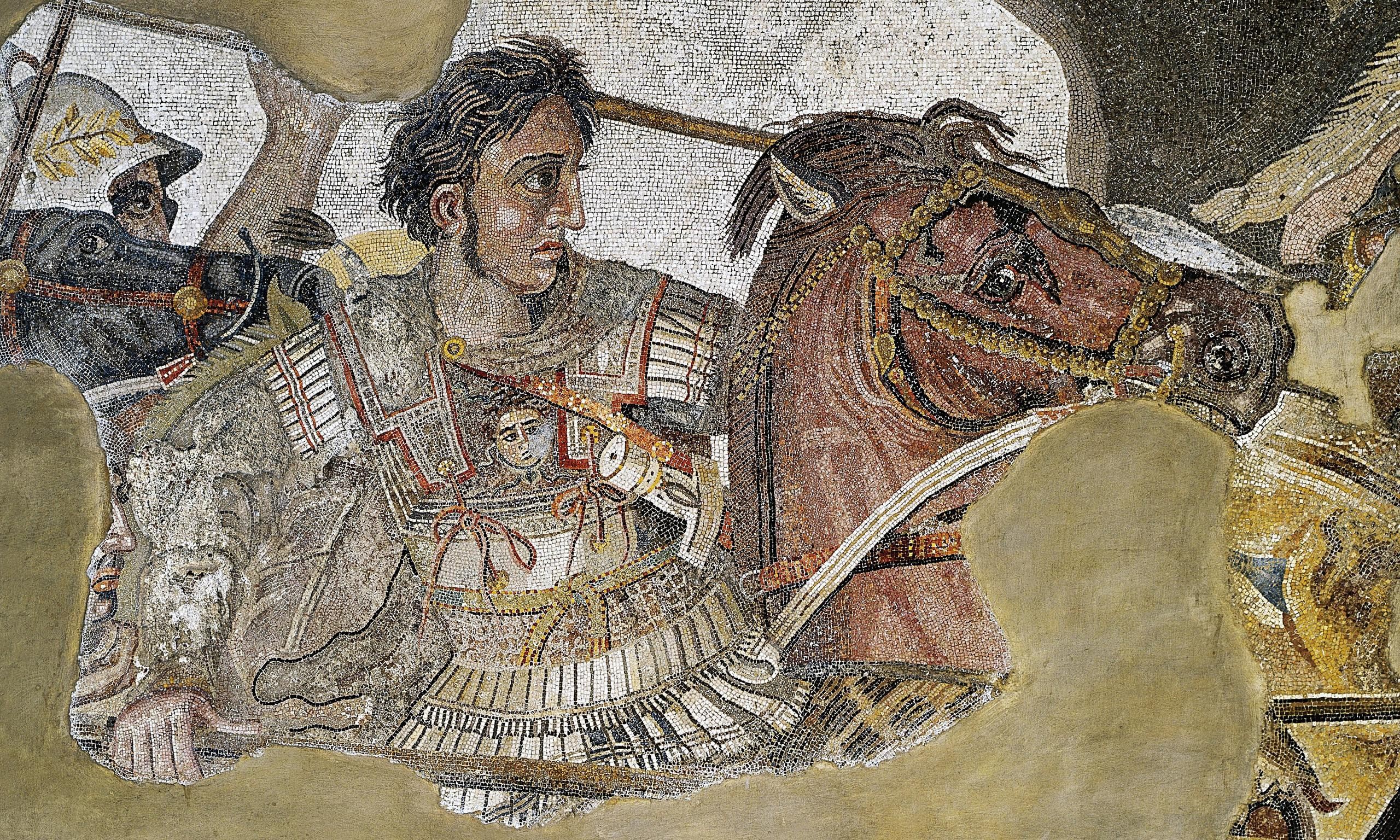
Detail of Alexander Mosaic, depicting Alexander the Great, c. 100 BC, Pompeii

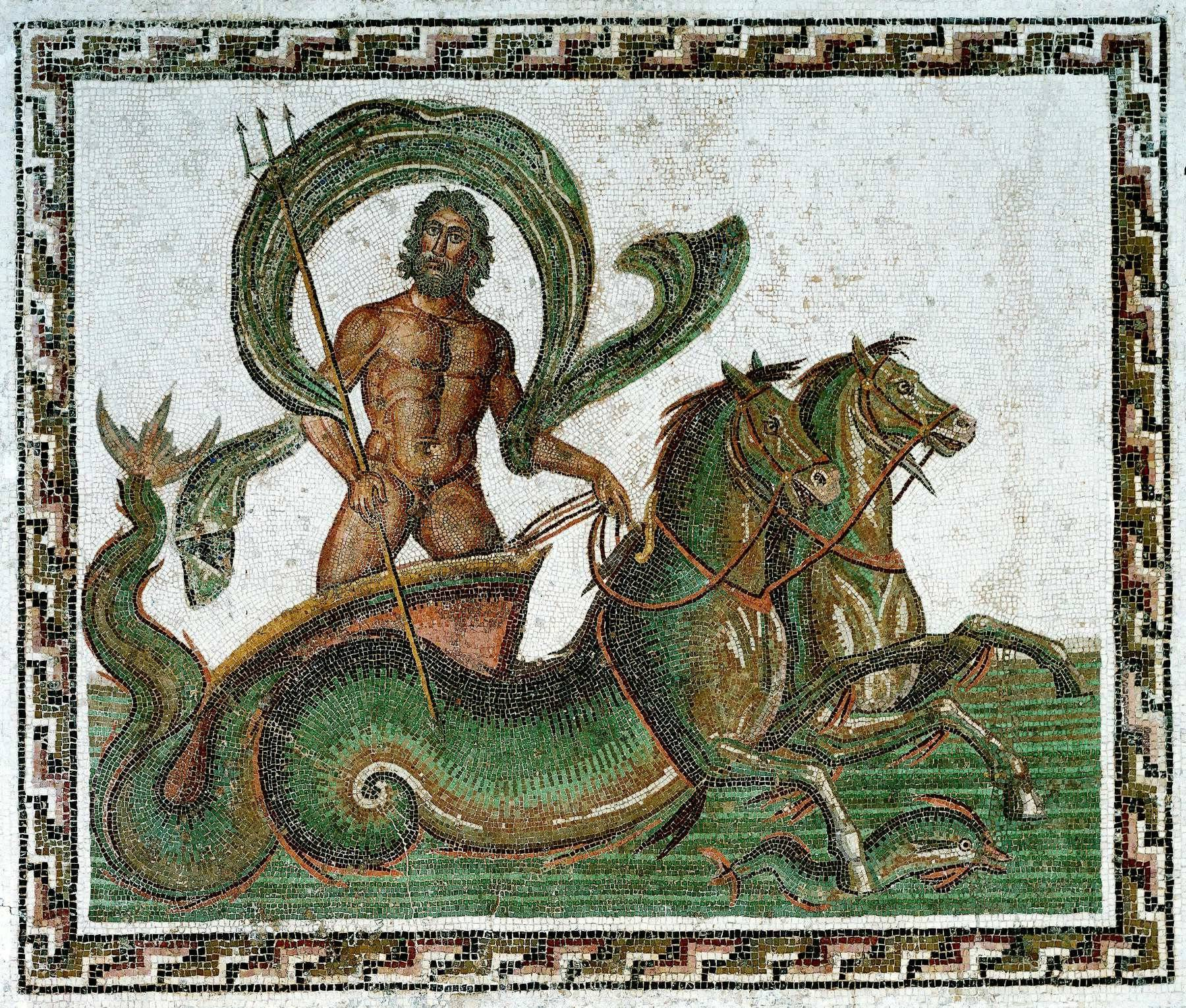
Neptune driving his chariot

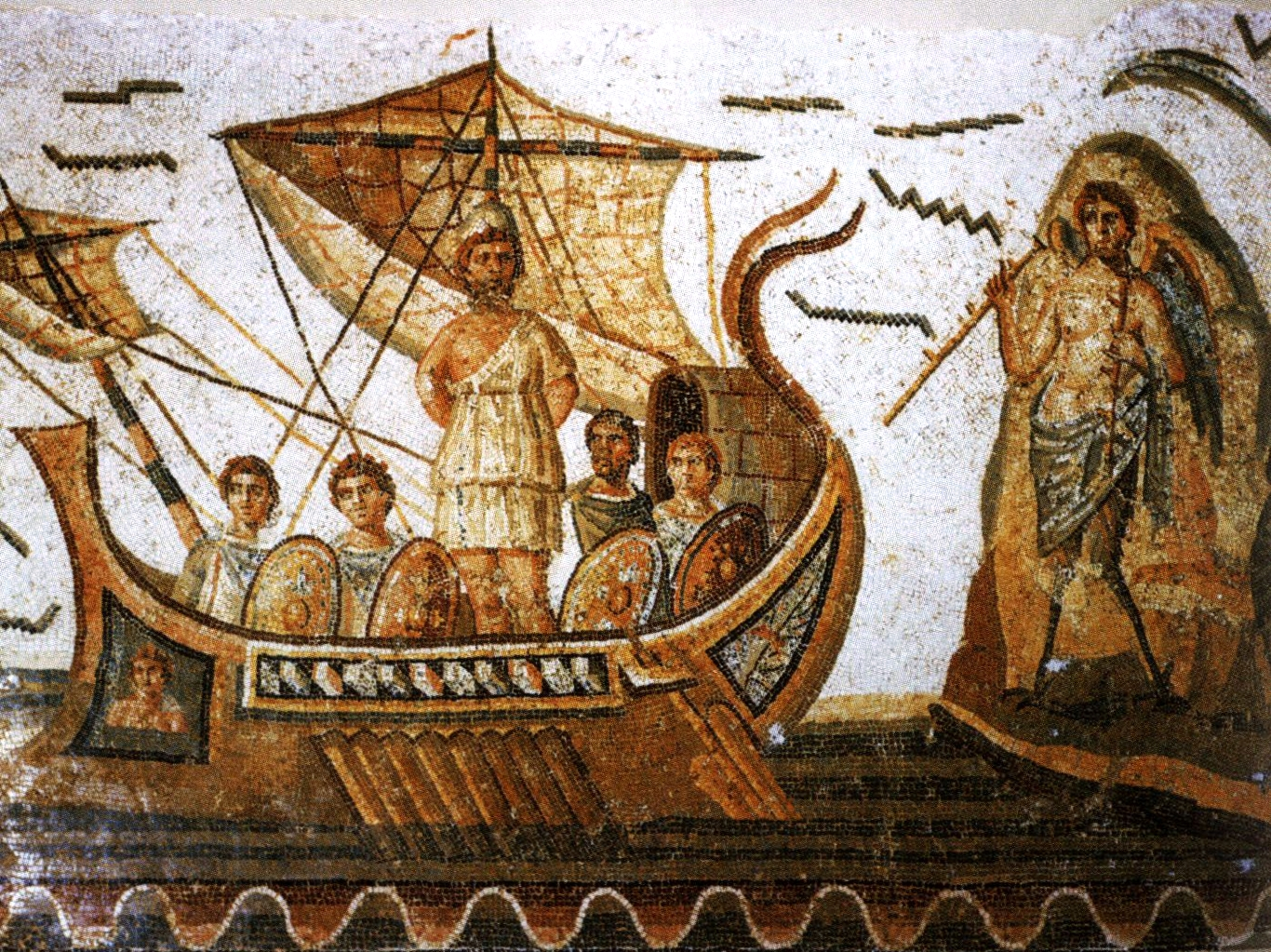
Ulysses during his journey

The Centaur mosaic (2nd-century), found at Hadrian's Villa in Tivoli, Italy. Altes Museum, Berlin

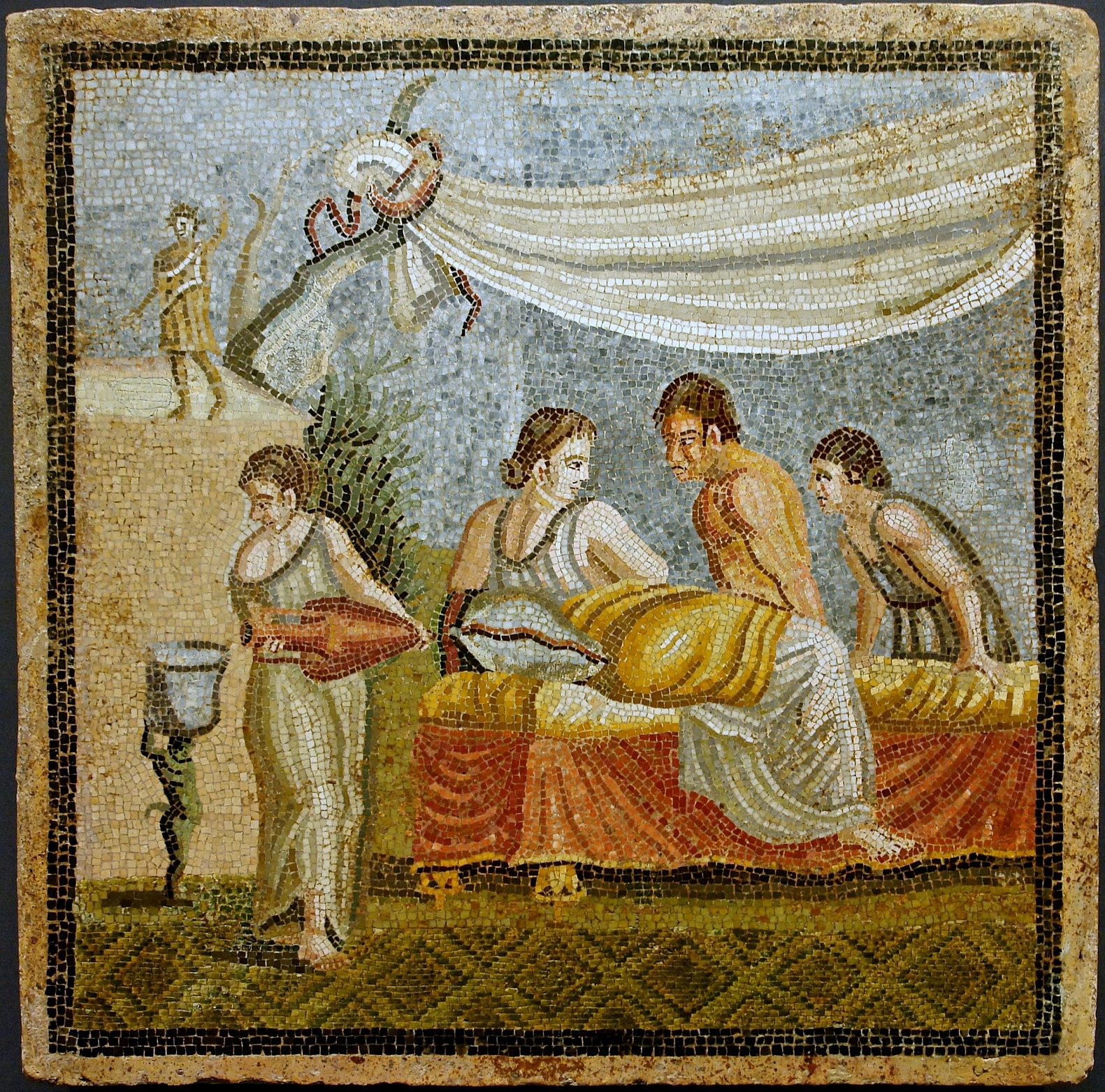
Love scene, 1st century

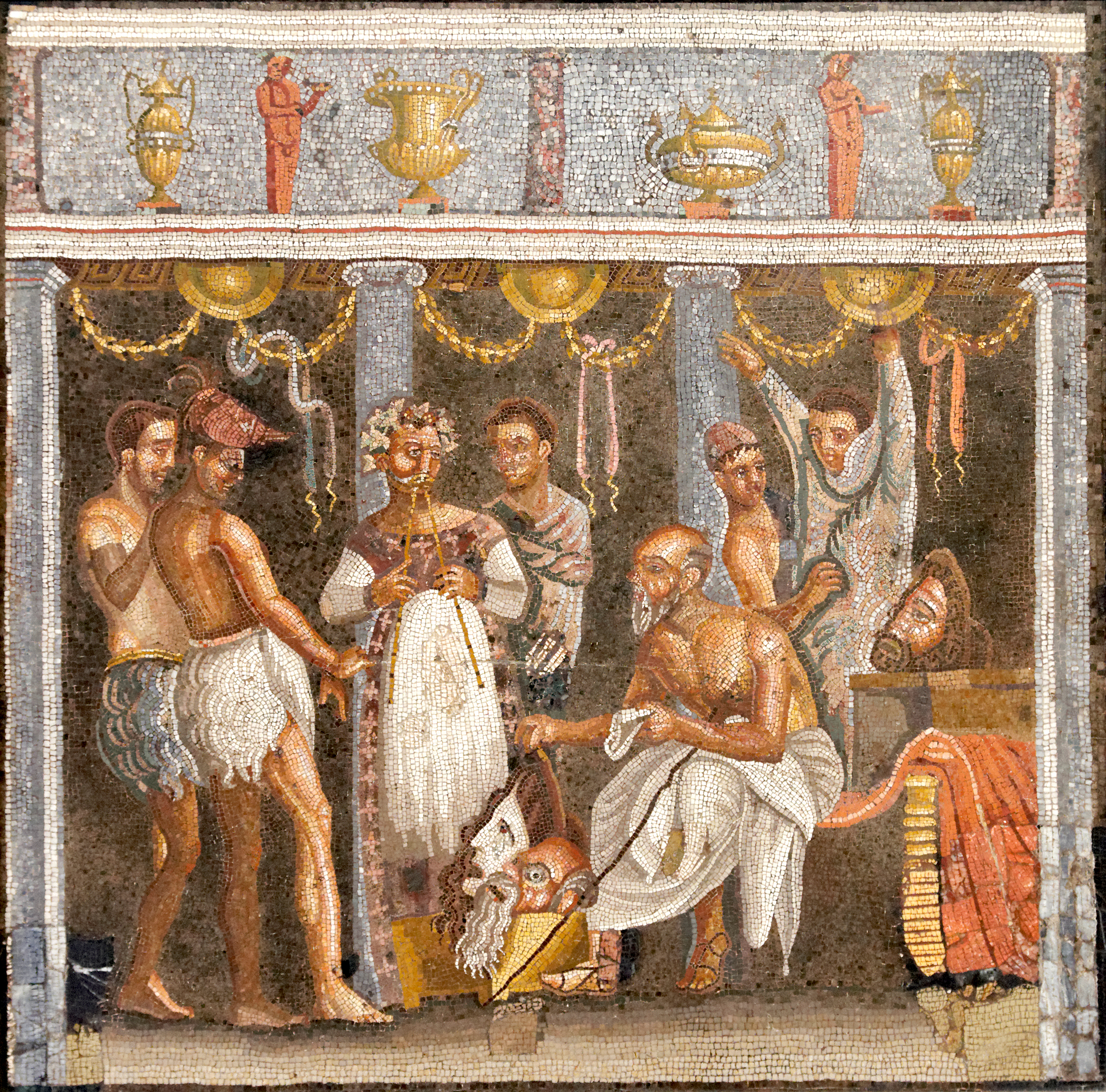
Roman mosaic depicting actors and an aulos player (House of the Tragic Poet, Pompeii)

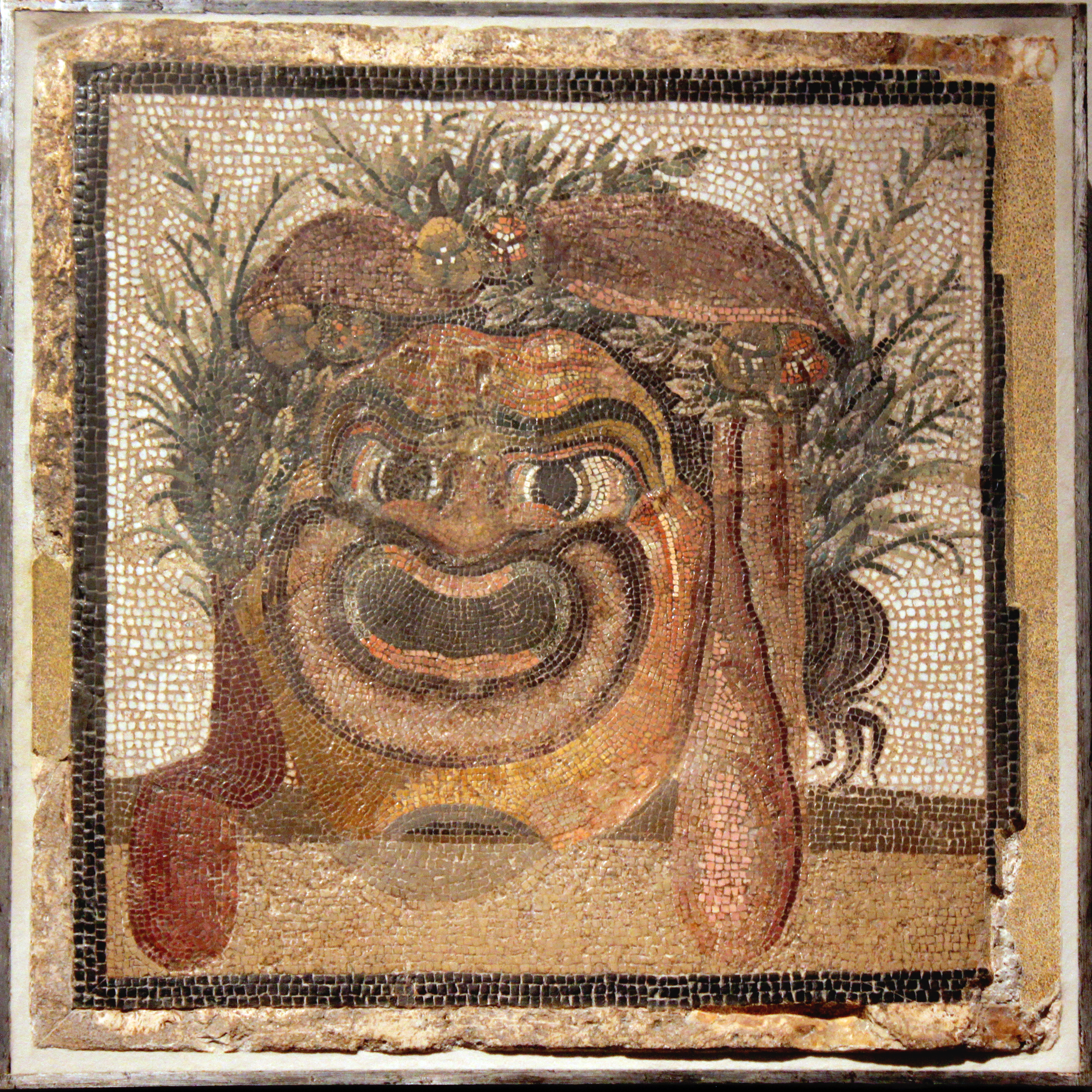
Comedy Mask

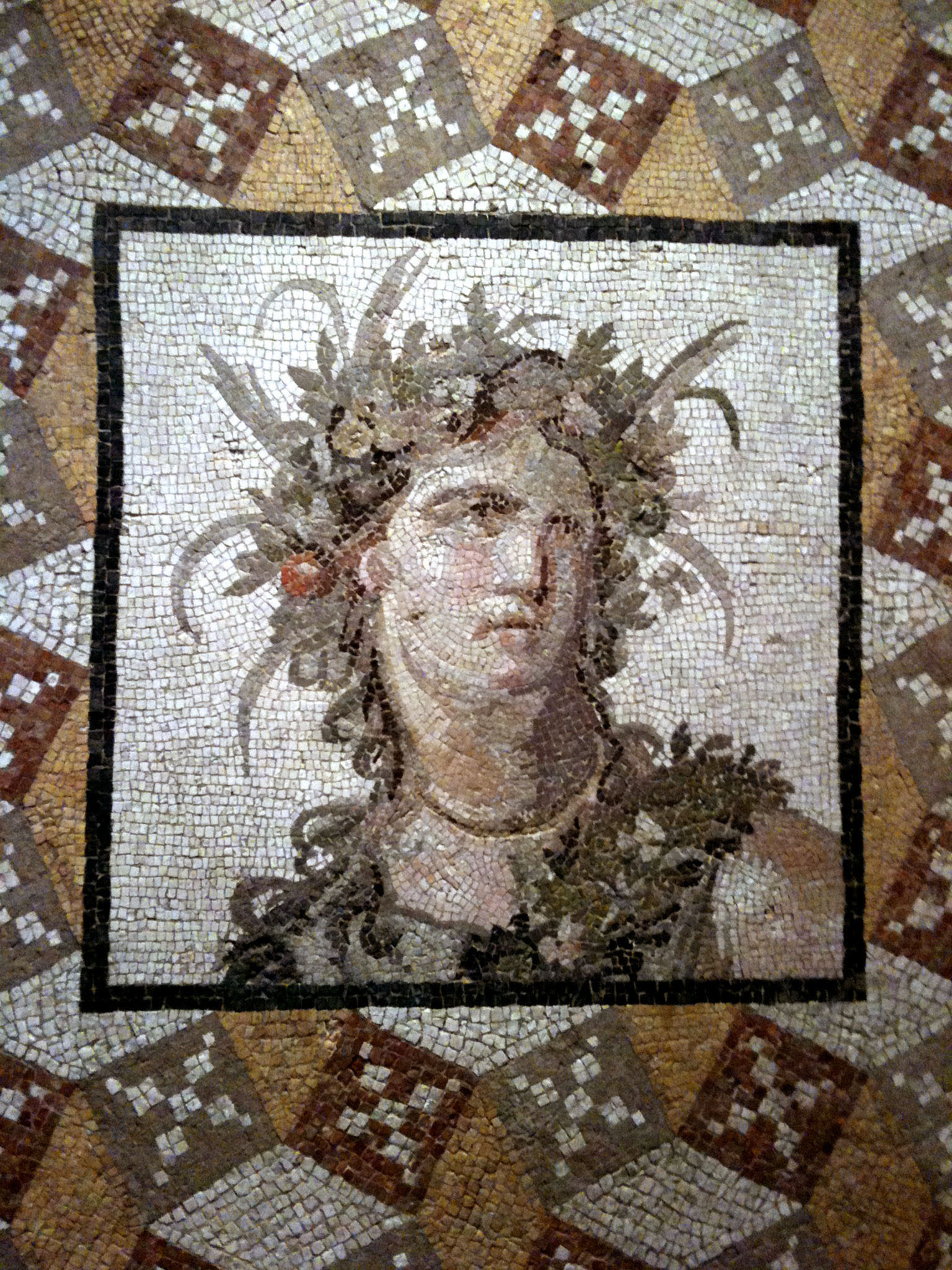
Antioch Mosaic

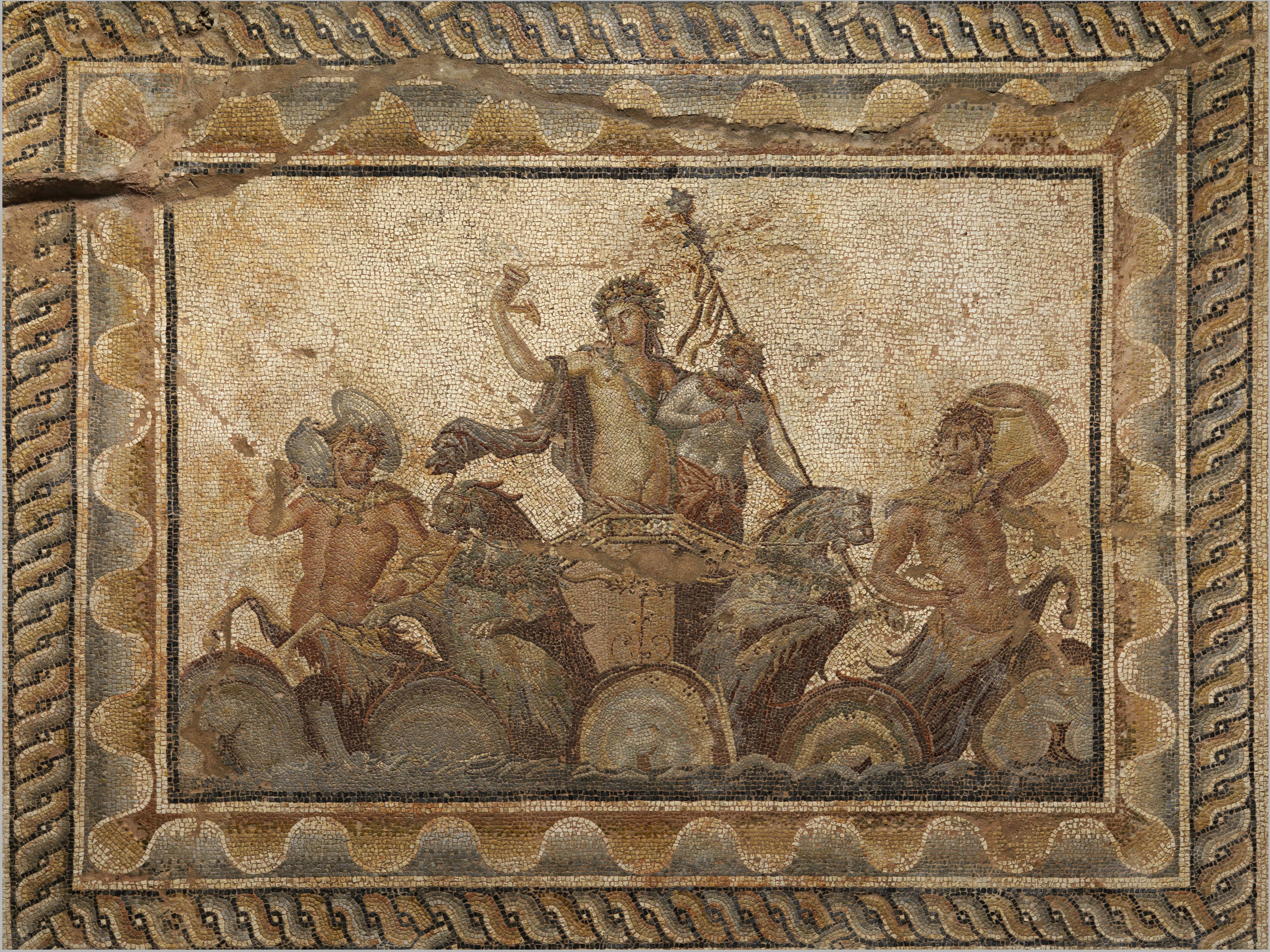
Epiphany of Dionysus mosaic, from the Villa of Dionysus (2nd century AD) in Dion, Greece. Now in the Archeological Museum of Dion.

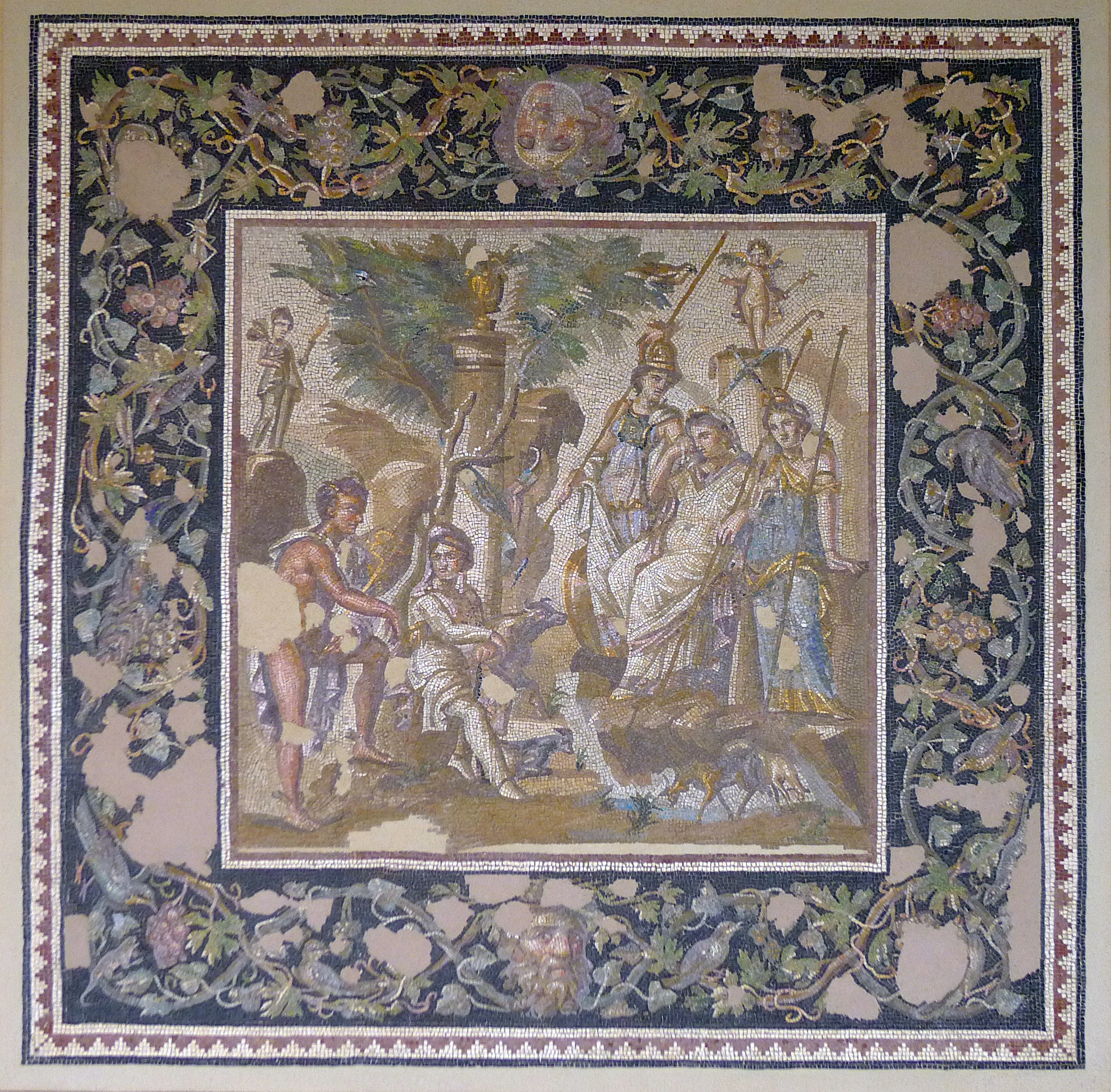
Judgment of Paris, marble, limestone and glass tesserae, 115–150 AD; from the Atrium House triclinium in Antioch-on-the-Orontes

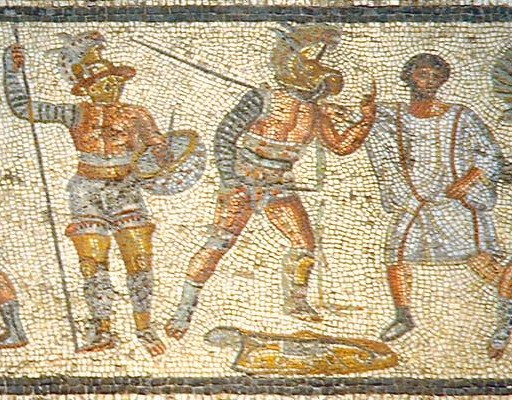
The Zliten mosaic showing gladiators, 2nd century AD

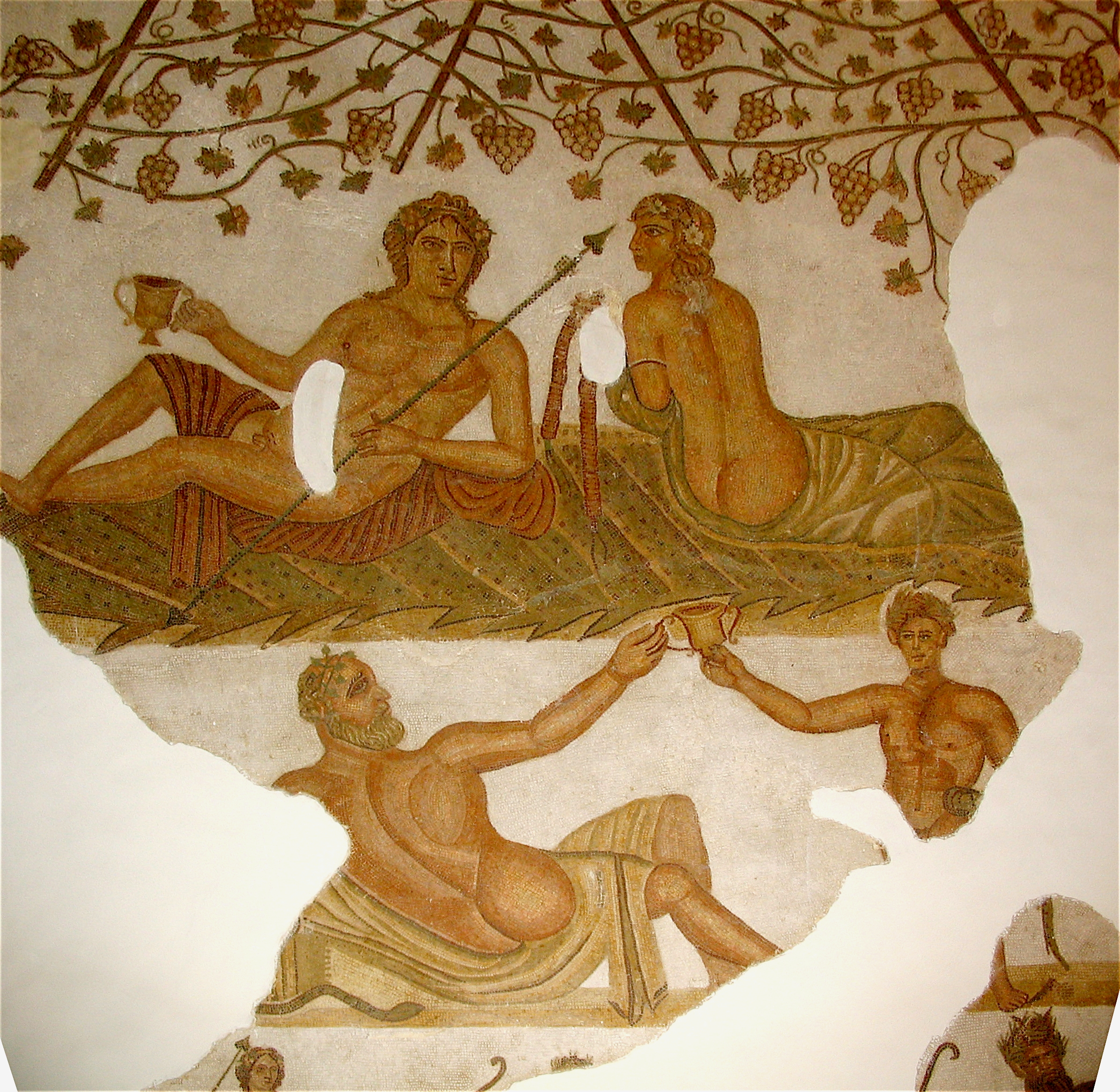
A Roman mosaic depicting the wedding of Dionysos and Ariadne, with Silenus and a satyr, 2nd century AD, Tunis, Tunisia

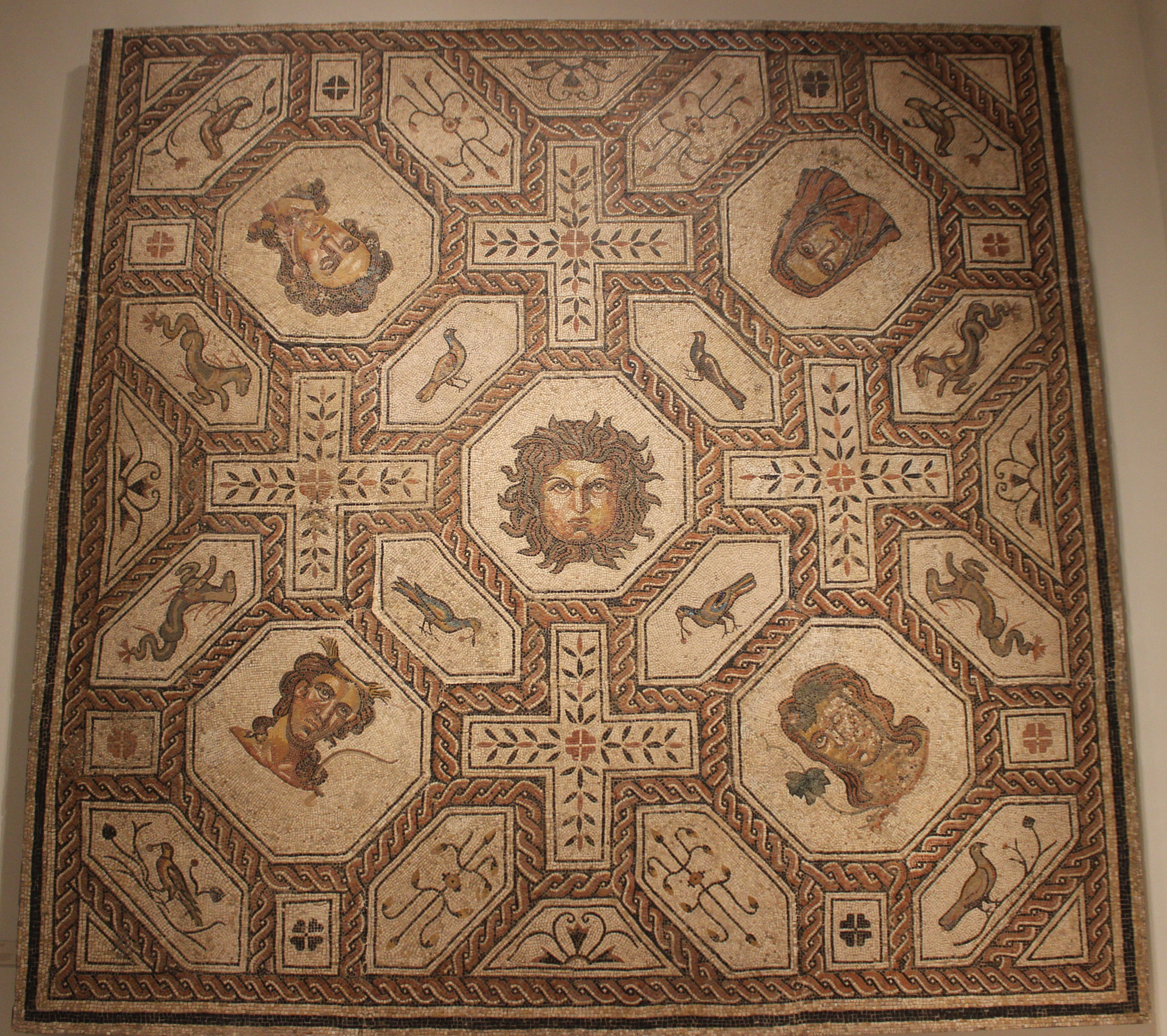
A mosaic showing Medusa and representational figures of the four seasons, from Palencia, Spain, made between 167 and 200 AD

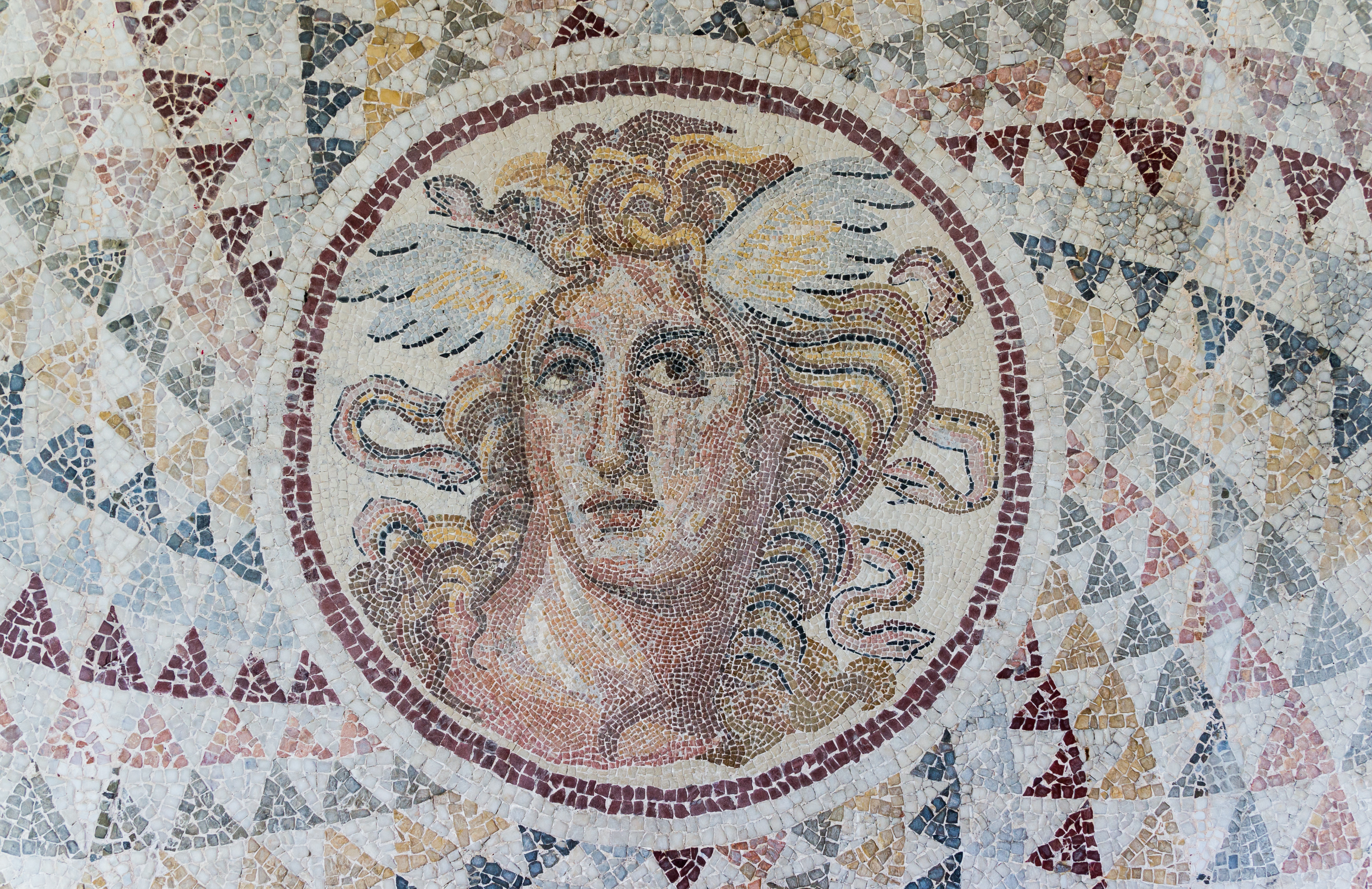
A Roman mosaic from Piraeus depicting Medusa, using opus tessellatum, 2nd century AD, National Archaeological Museum of Athens

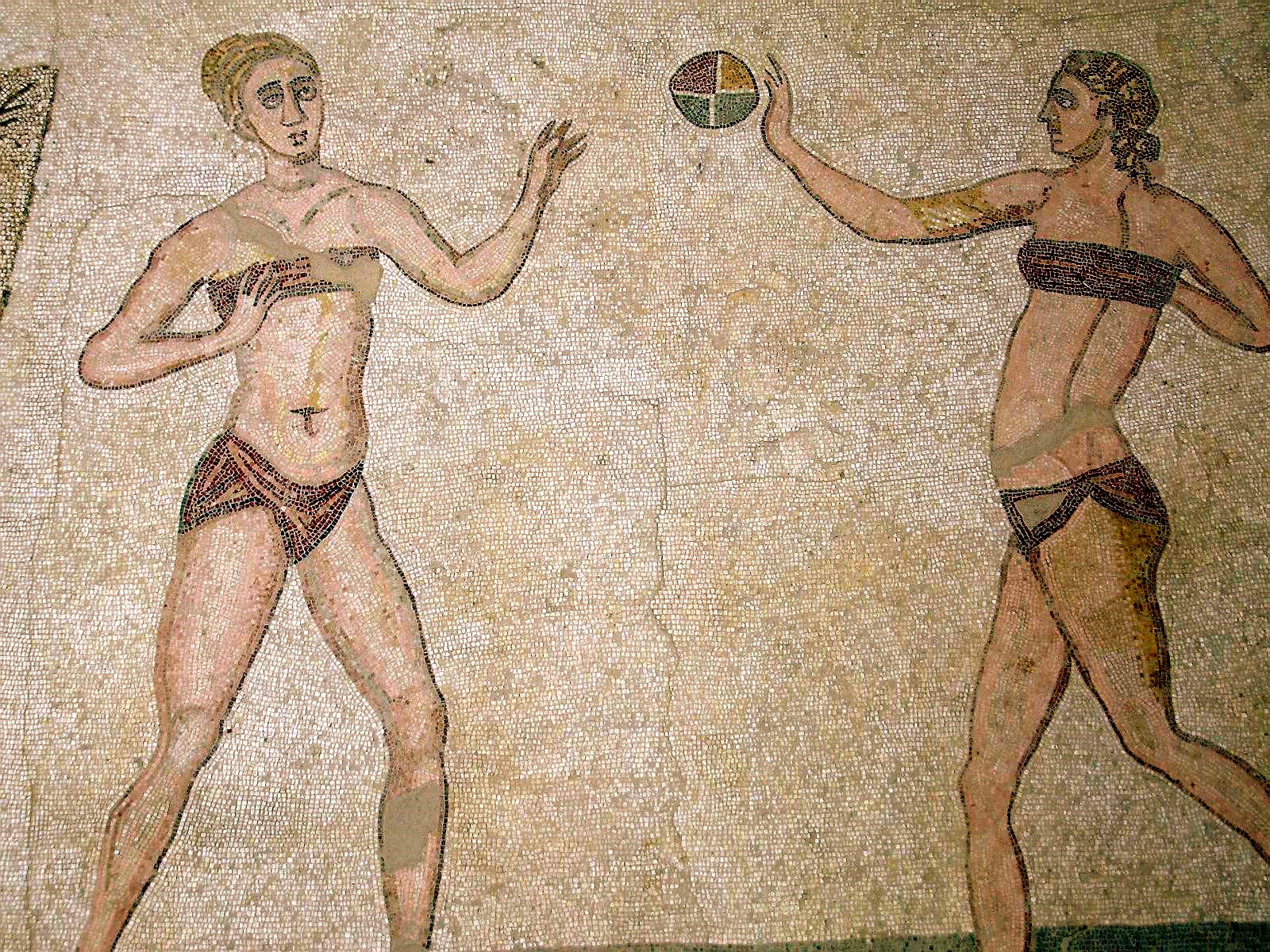
Mosaic of female athletes playing ball at the Villa Romana del Casale of Piazza Armerina, 4th century AD

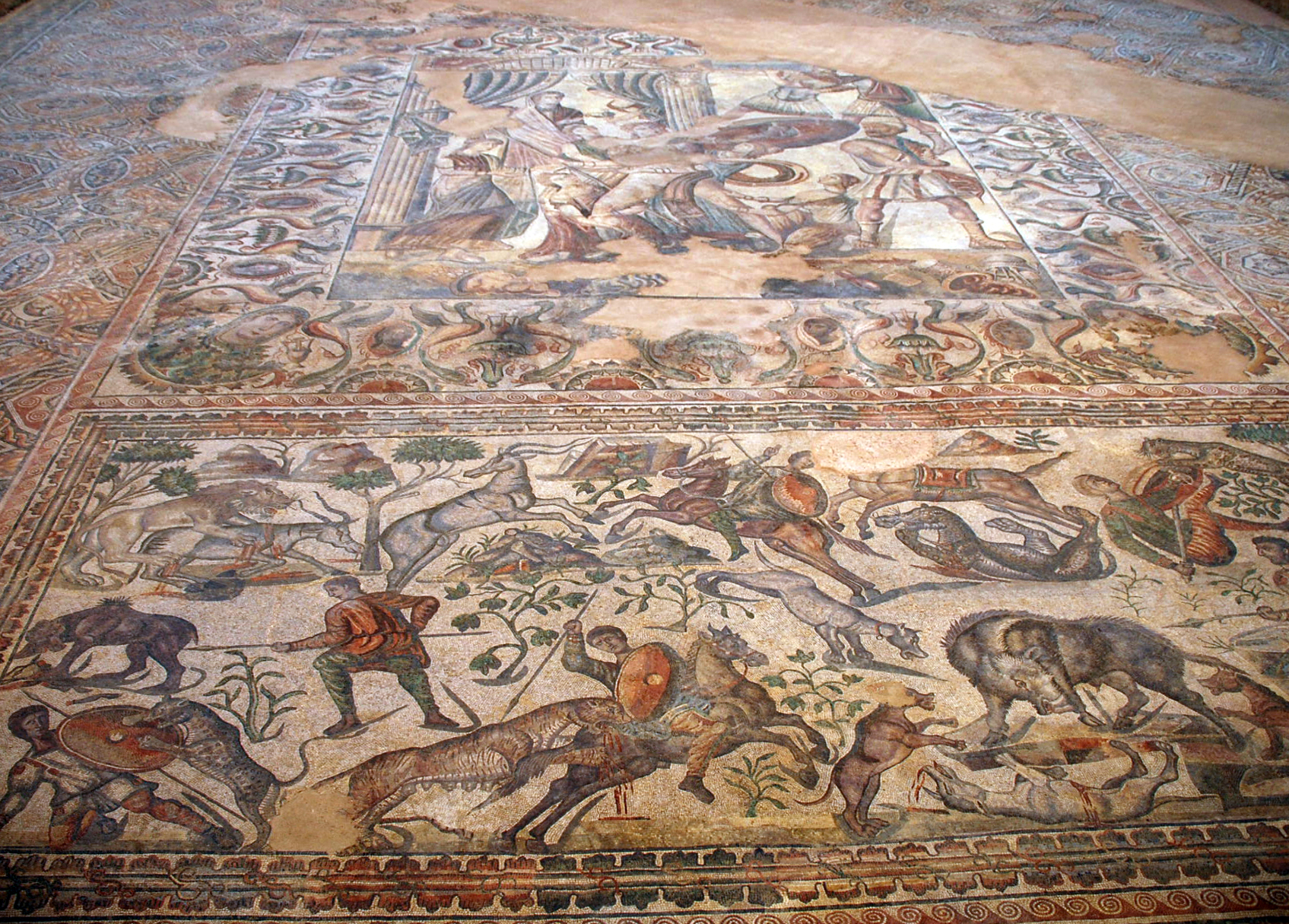
Late Roman mosaics at Villa Romana La Olmeda, Spain, 4th-5th centuries AD

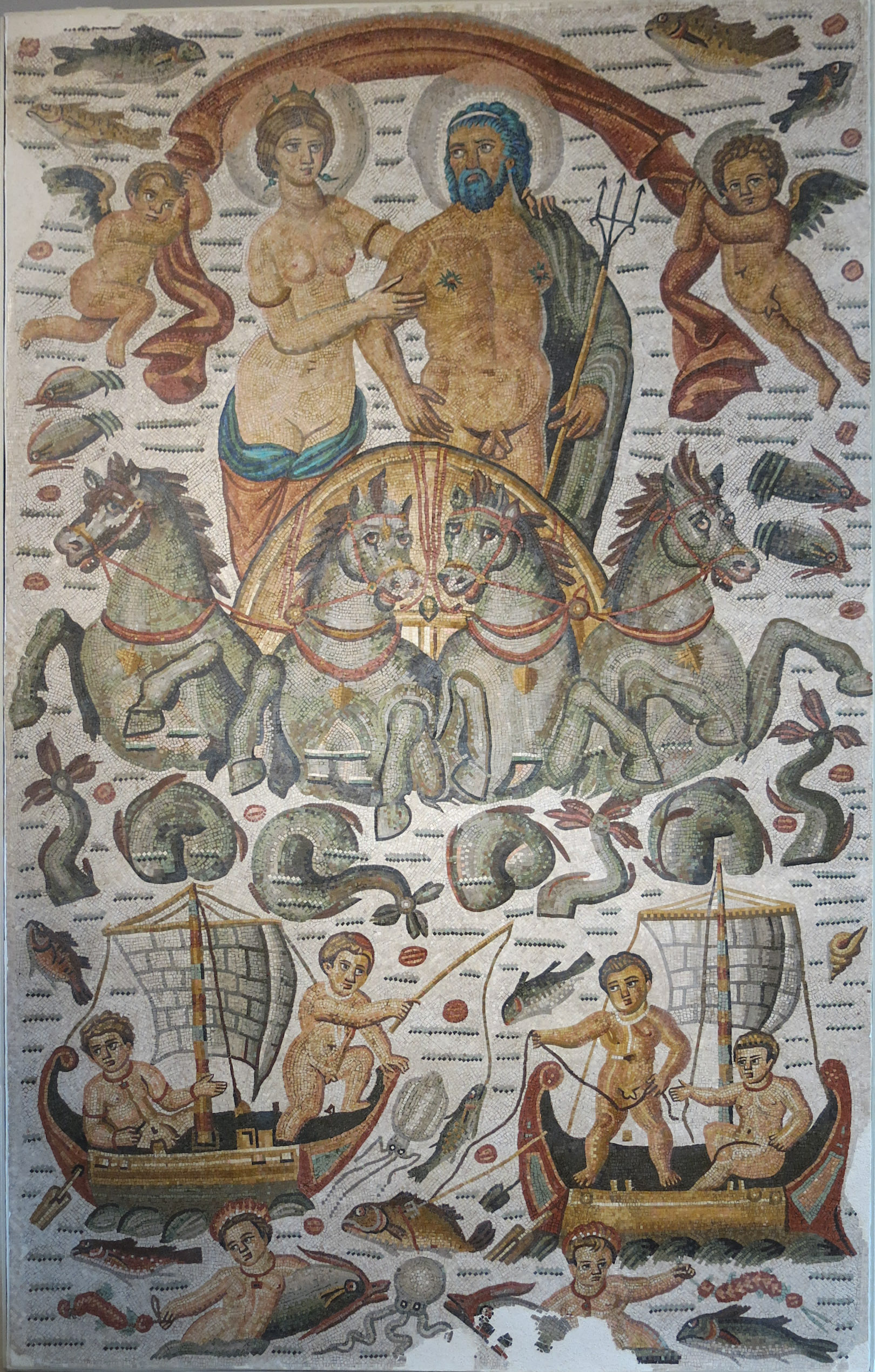
Triumph of Poseidon and Amphitrite showing the couple in procession, detail of a mosaic from Cirta, Roman Africa, 315–325 AD, Louvre

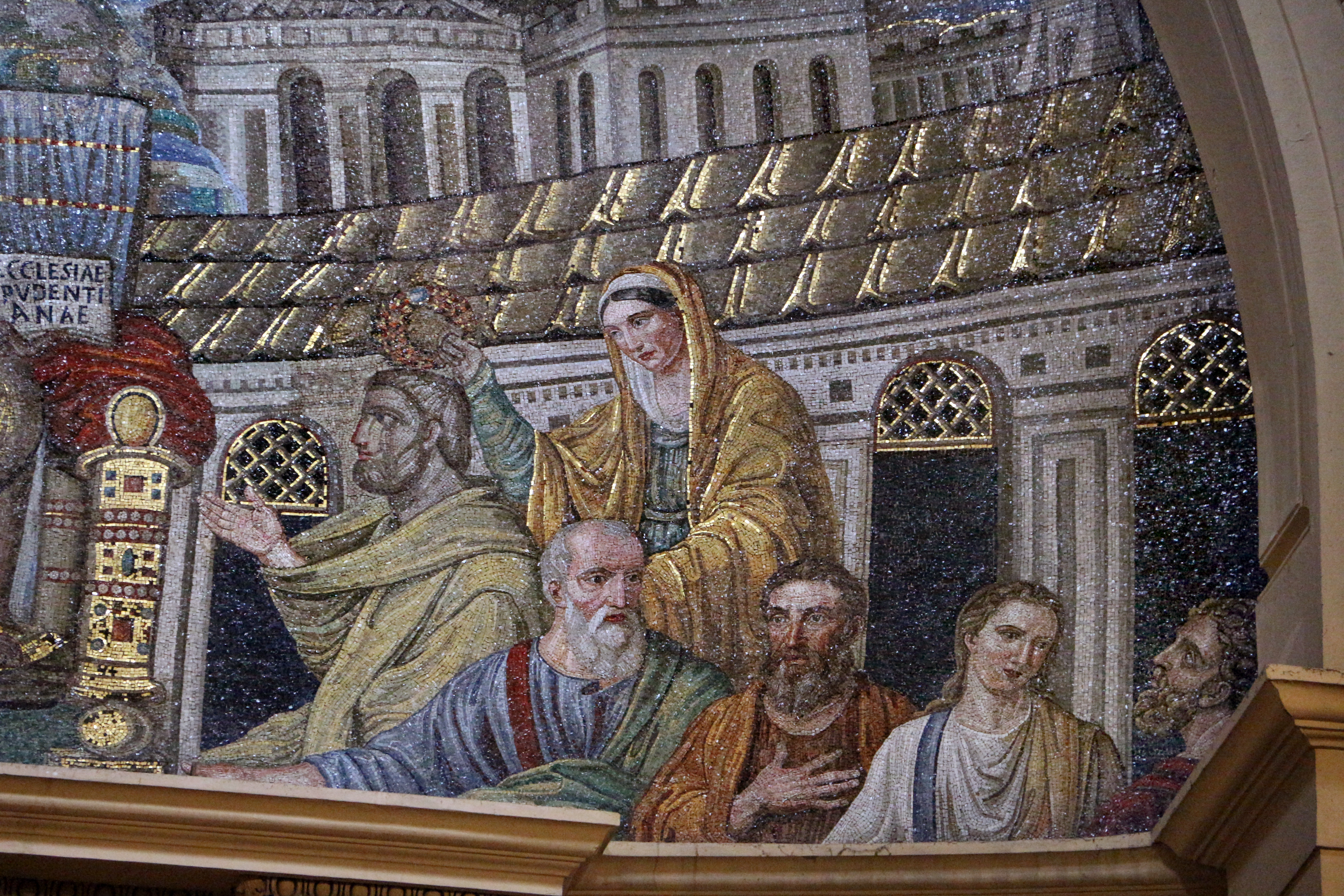
Paleochristian mosaic from Santa Pudenziana in Rome, c. 410 AD

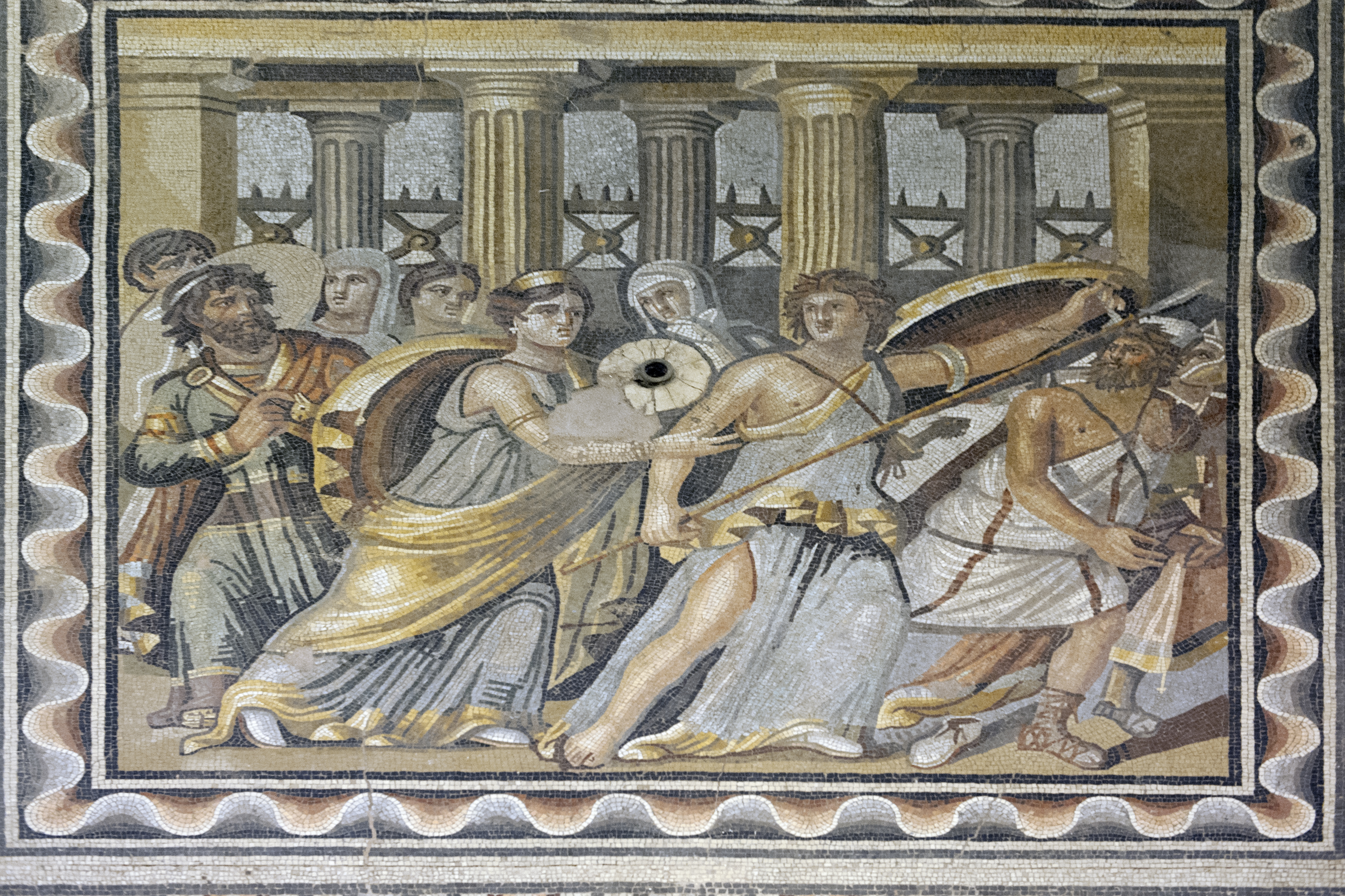
A mosaic from the Roman era Poseidon Villa in Zeugma, Commagene (now in the Zeugma Mosaic Museum) depicting Achilles on Skyros disguised as a woman and Odysseus tricking him into revealing himself

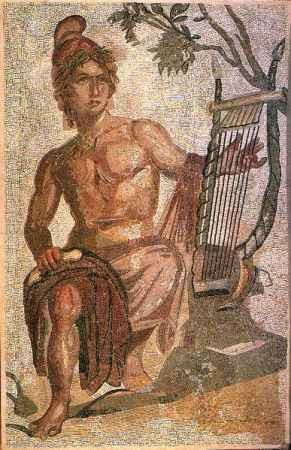
Mosaic of Orpheus from Caralis, modern Cagliari (Italy), now in Archeological Museum of Turin

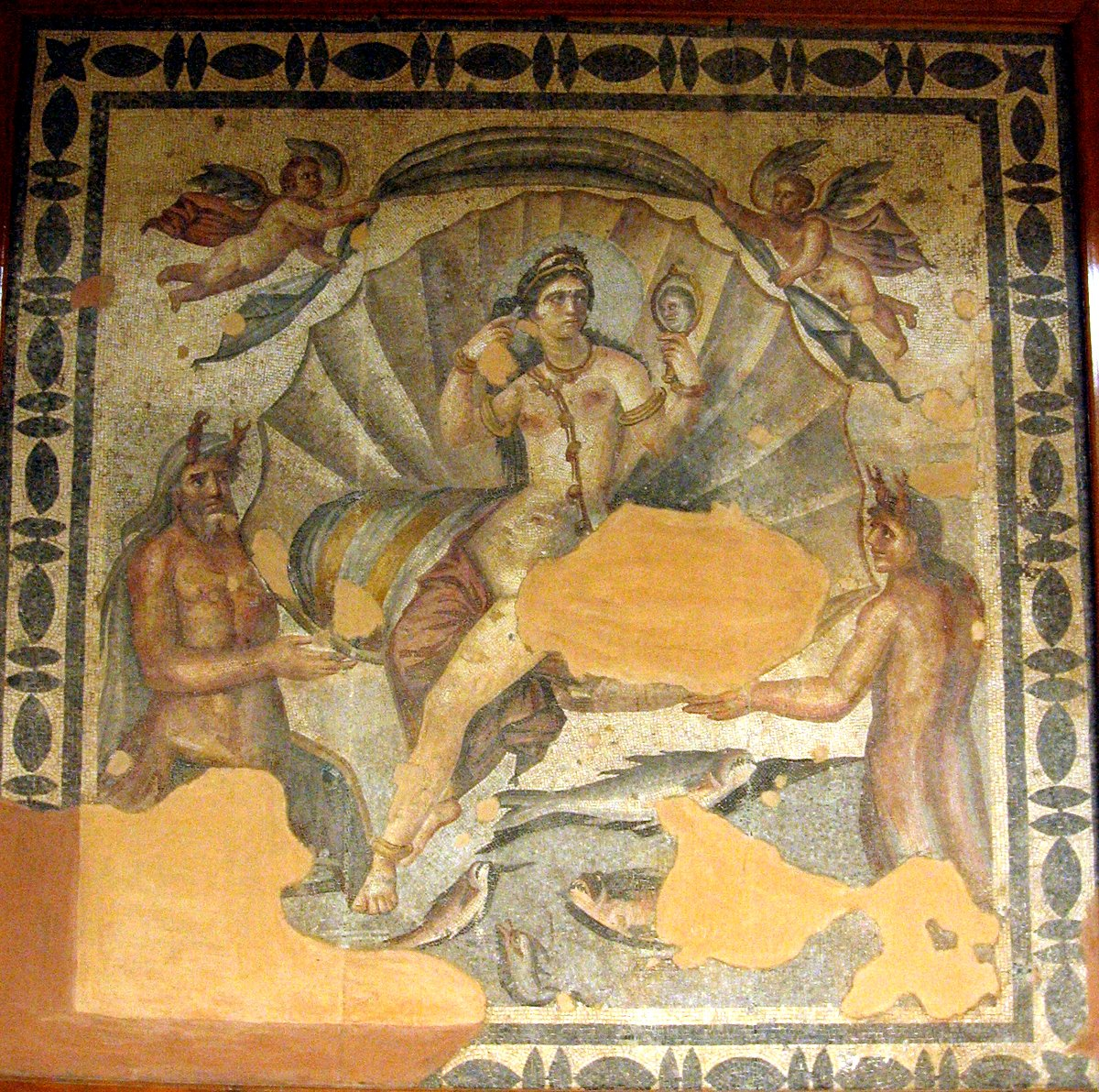
Mosaic of Diana bathing. As-Suwayda, Syria

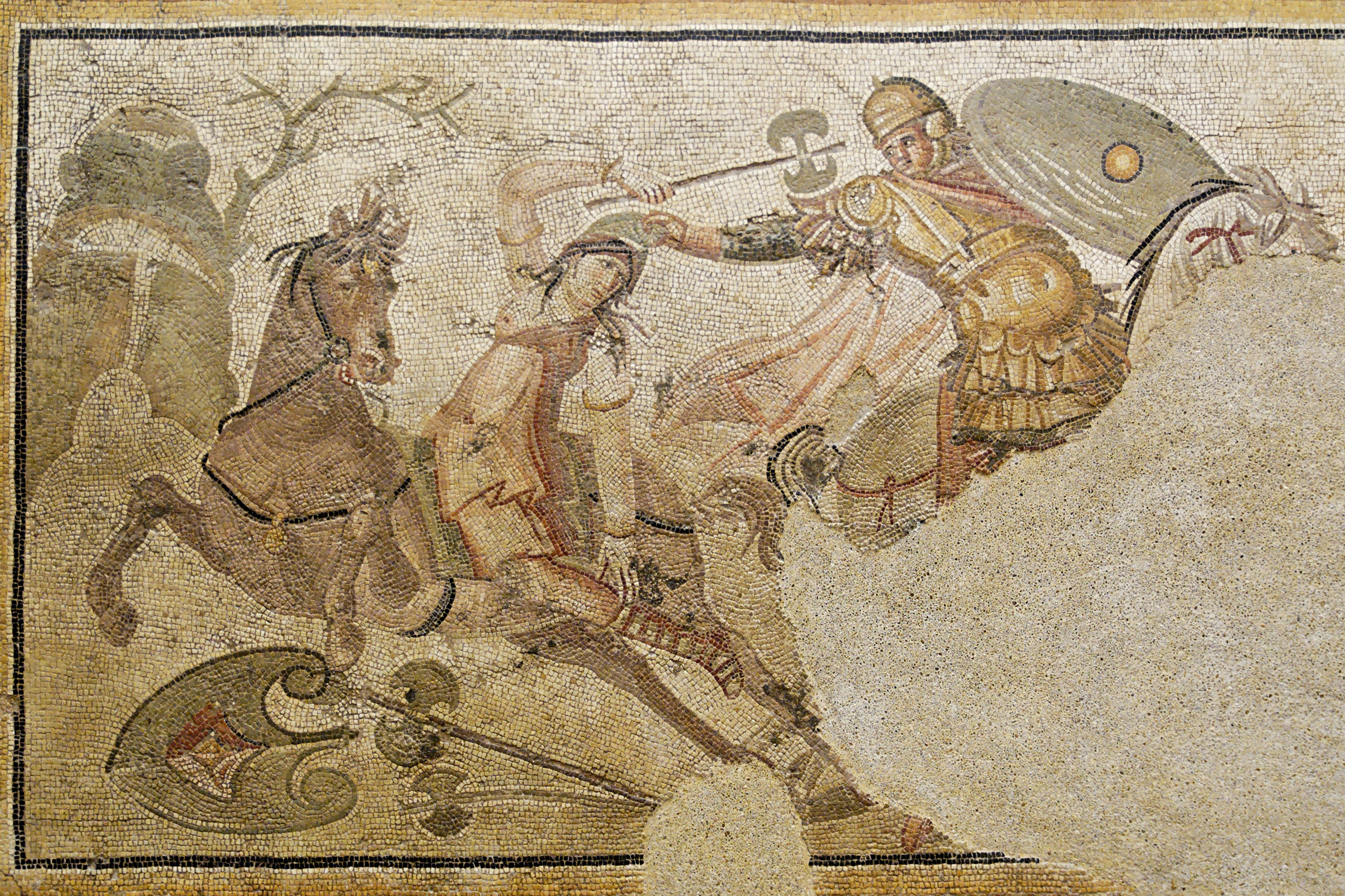
Mosaic of Amazon warrior engaged in combat with a hippeus, 4th century AD, Louvre

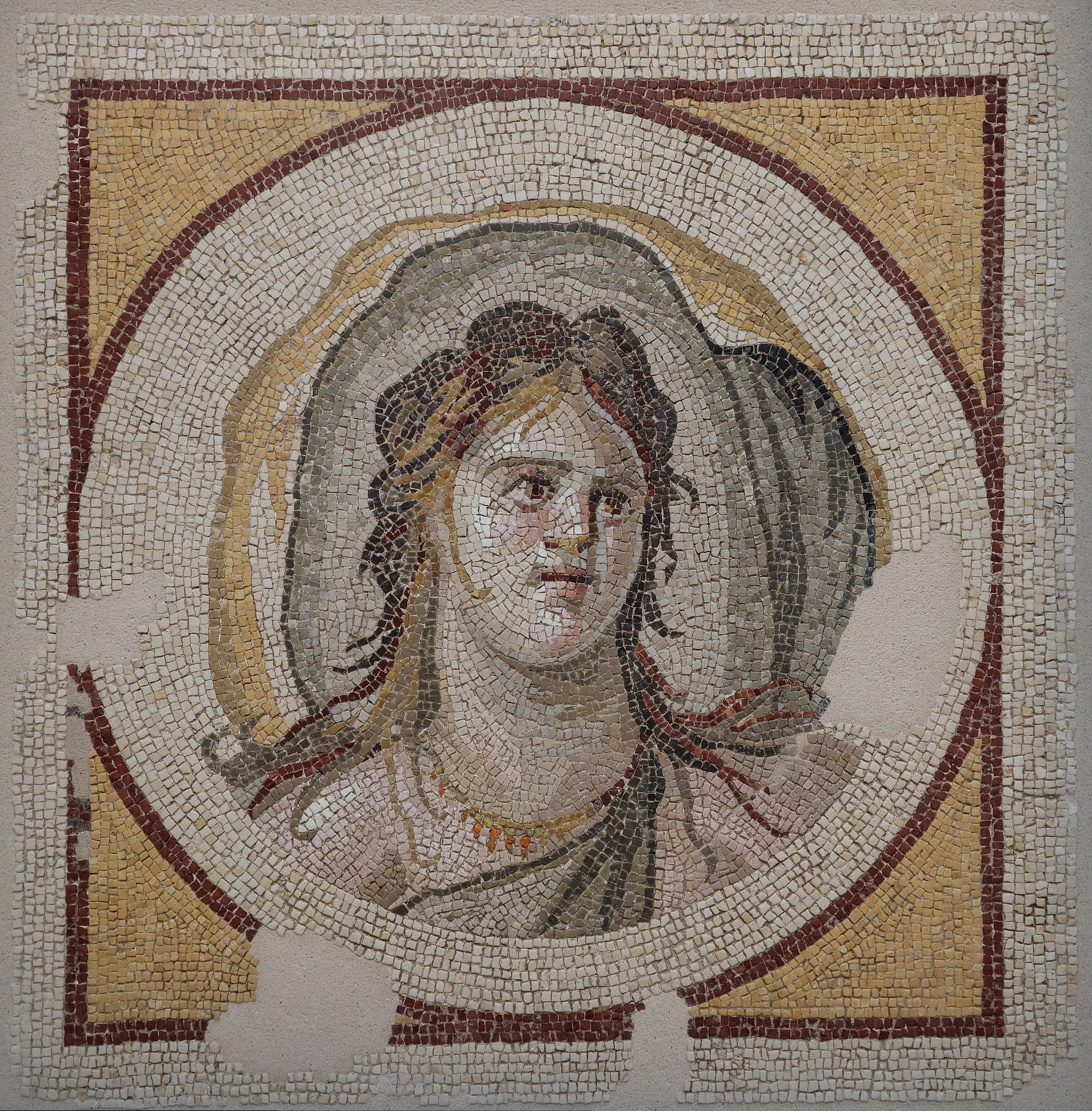
Mosaic depicting a feminine personification, from the Boat house of Psyche in Daphne (suburb of Antioch), beginning of 3rd century AD, Louvre Museum.

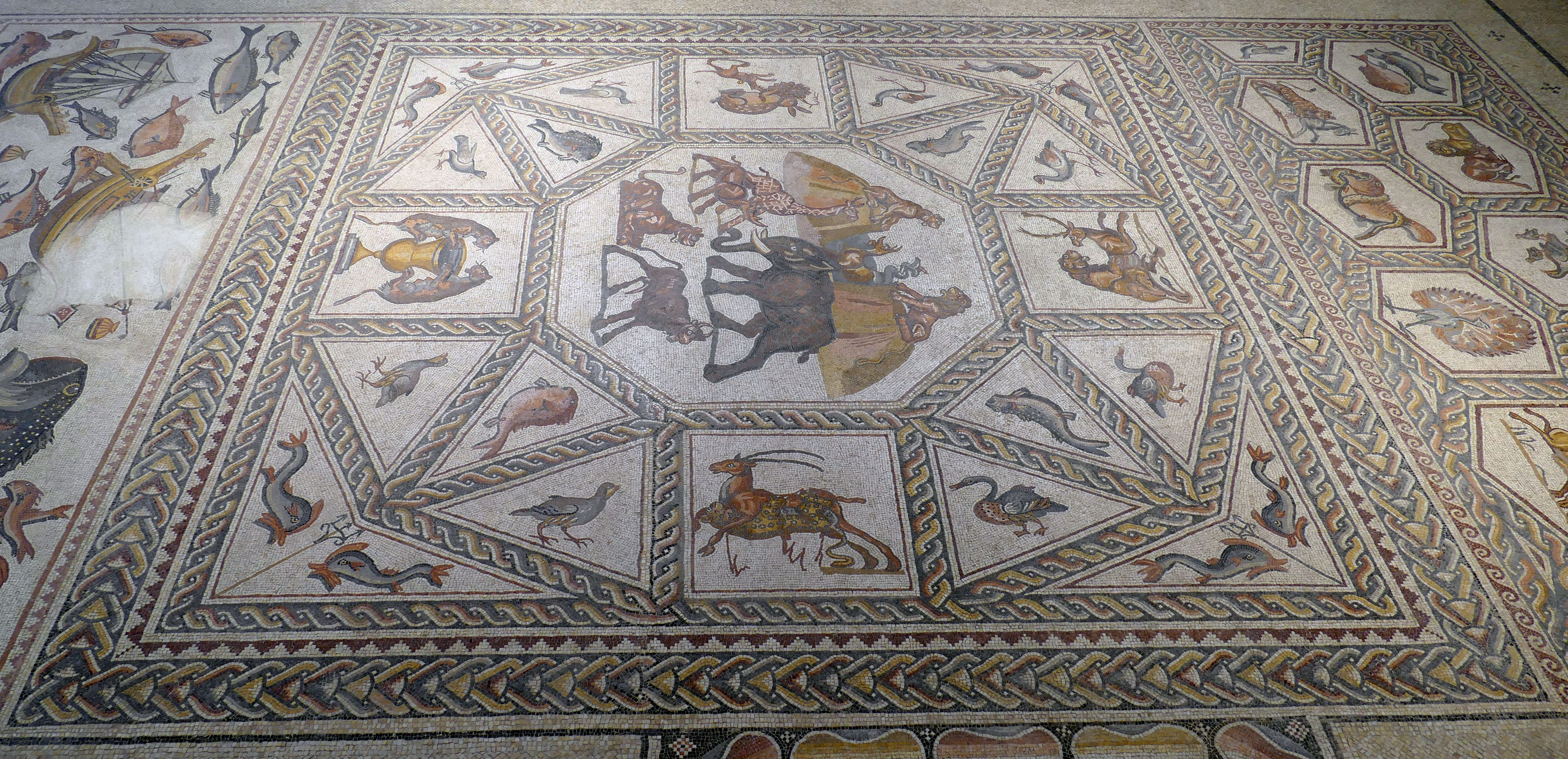
Detail of Lod Mosaic, depicting a variety of land animals, 3rd century CE in Lod, Israel

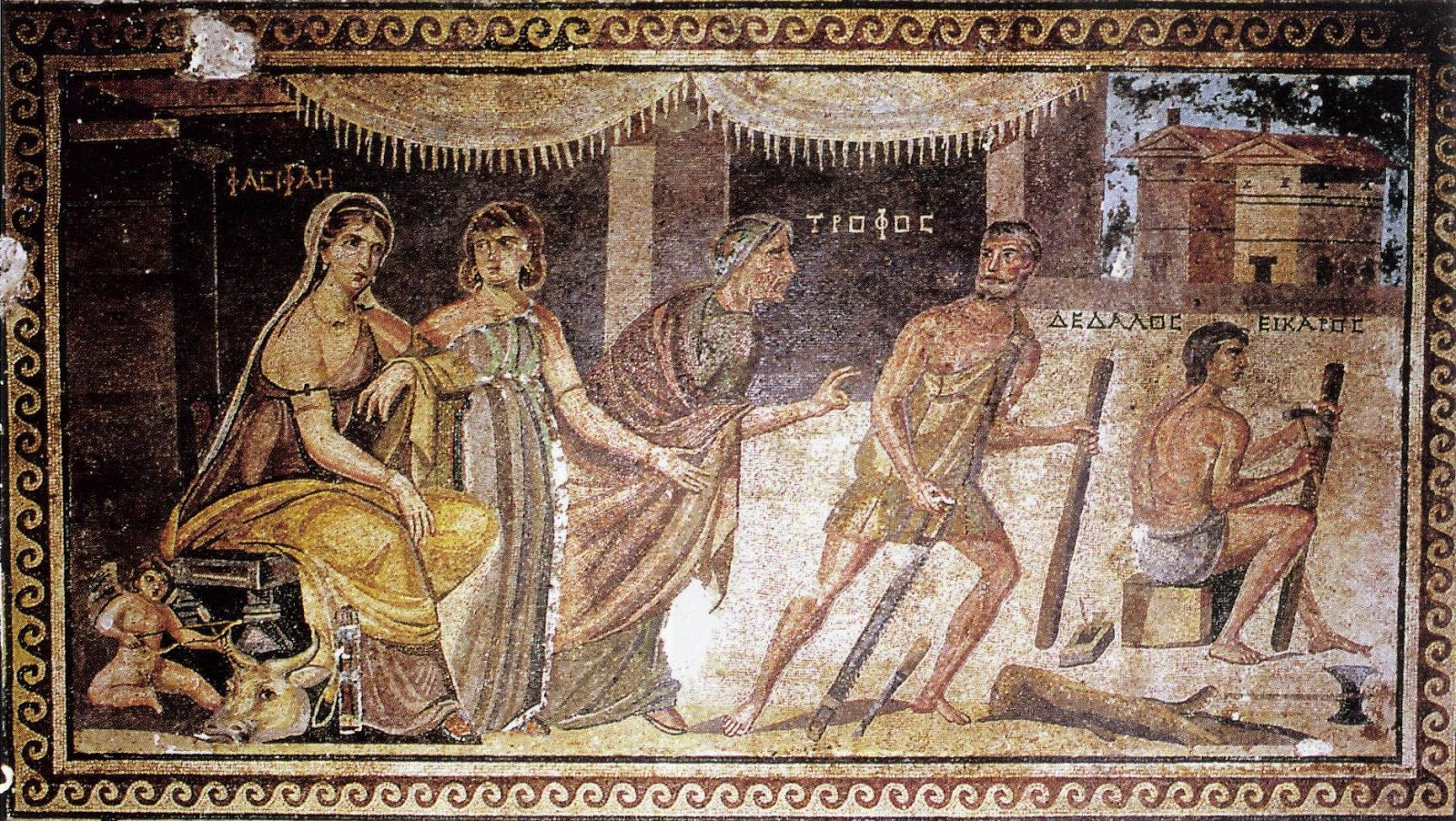
Pasiphae, Daedalus and the wooden cow, Zeugma Mosaic Museum

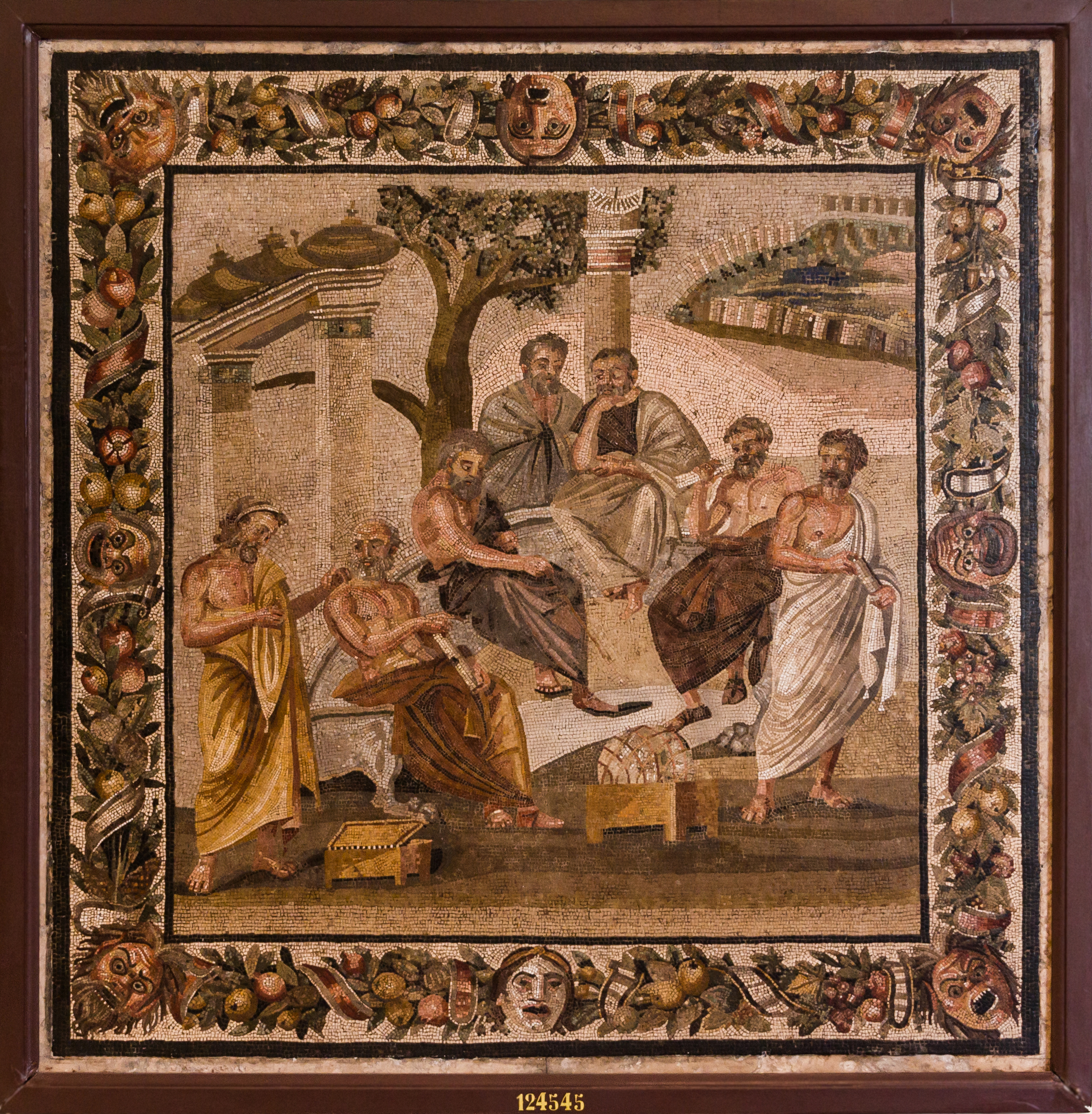
Plato's Academy Mosaic, from Pompeii, in the National Archaeological Museum, Naples

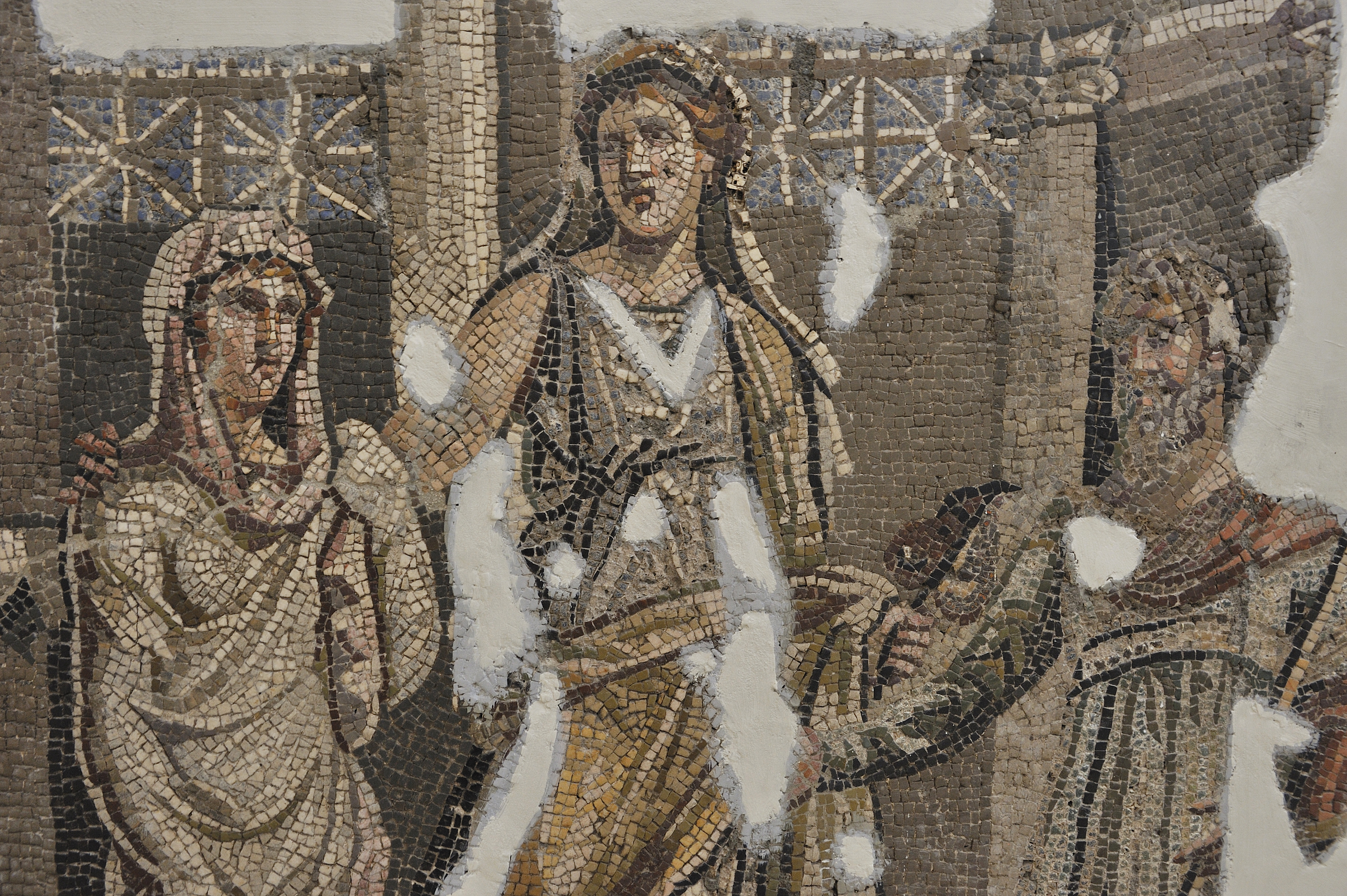
Iphigenia in Aulis mosaic

== See also ==
- Proclus (mosaicist)
- Roman art
- Zeugma Mosaic Museum
- Mosaic of the Horses of Carthage

== Sources ==
- Bertoldi, Susanna (2011). The Vatican Museums: discover the history, the works of art, the collections [I Musei Vaticani: conoscere la storia, le opere, le collezioni]. Sillabe. ISBN 978-8882712105.
- Donaldson, M. Katherine (1965). "A Pebble Mosaic in Peiraeus" (PDF). Hesperia: The Journal of the American School of Classical Studies at Athens. 34 (2): 77–88. JSTOR 147018.
- Dunbabin, Katherine, M. D. (1979), "Technique and Materials of Hellenistic Mosaics", American Journal of Archaeology, 83 (3), Archaeological Institute of America: 265–277, doi:10.2307/505057, JSTOR 507451, S2CID 193097937.
- Dunbabin, Katherine M. D. (1999). Mosaics of the Greek and Roman world. Cambridge University Press. ISBN 978-0521461436.
- Joyce, Hetty (1979), "Form, Function and Technique in the Pavements of Delos and Pompeii", American Journal of Archaeology, 83 (3), Archaeological Institute of America: 253–263, doi:10.2307/505056, JSTOR 505056, S2CID 191394716.
- Neri, Elisabetta; Verità, Marco (2013). "Glass and metal analyses of gold leaf tesserae from 1st to 9th century mosaics. A contribution to technological and chronological knowledge". Journal of Archaeological Science. 40 (12): 4596–4606. Bibcode:2013JArSc..40.4596N. doi:10.1016/j.jas.2013.07.017. hdl:2158/1297266.
- Oliver, Andrew (2001). "A Glass Opus Sectile Panel from Corinth" (PDF). Hesperia: The Journal of the American School of Classical Studies at Athens. 70 (3): 349–363. JSTOR 3182066.
- Packard, Pamela M. (1980). "A Monochrome Mosaic at Isthmia" (PDF). Hesperia: The Journal of the American School of Classical Studies at Athens. 49 (4): 326–346. JSTOR 147913.
- Ricciardi, Paola; Colomban, Philippe; Tournié, Aurélie; Macchiarola, Michele; Ayed, Naceur (2009). "A non-invasive study of Roman Age mosaic glass tesserae by means of Raman spectroscopy". Journal of Archaeological Science. 36 (11): 2551–2559. Bibcode:2009JArSc..36.2551R. doi:10.1016/j.jas.2009.07.008.
- Westgate, Ruth (2000), "Pavimenta atque emblemata vermiculata: Regional Styles in Hellenistic Mosaic and the First Mosaics at Pompeii", American Journal of Archaeology, 104 (2), Archaeological Institute of America: 255–275, doi:10.2307/507451, JSTOR 507451, S2CID 194101486.
- Witts, Patricia (2005). Mosaics in Roman Britain: Stories in Stone. Stroud: History Press. ISBN 978-0752434216.
