= Katherine Dunbabin =

Classical archaeologist

Academic background
- Education: University of Oxford
- Thesis: Studies in the mosaic pavements of Roman North Africa (1970)

Academic work
- Discipline: Classics
- Sub-discipline: Roman art
- Institutions: McMaster University

Katherine Dunbabin is an archaeologist specialising in Roman art and Professor Emerita of Classics at McMaster University.

== Career ==
Dunbabin studied at the University of Oxford, and was awarded her doctorate in 1970. Her thesis was titled Studies in the mosaic pavements of Roman North Africa. When Dunbabin started her DPhil there was little English-language research into Roman art. Her first book, The mosaics of Roman North Africa: studies in iconography and patronage with the Clarendon Press, was published in 1978. It was based on her doctoral research. Barry Cunliffe described it as 'a contribution to classical studies of considerable significance, for not only does it give a thorough treatment to a body of material of outstanding beauty and interest, but in doing so it greatly enlivens our understanding of the social, economic and artistic systems which pervade the Roman world.' Her interest in the subject of Roman art continued, and in 1999 she published a book, Mosaics of the Greek and Roman World, with Cambridge University Press. A review in The Telegraph described the book as 'a masterpiece of visual, historical, technical and social analysis'.

While preparing a book on mosaics, Dunbabin began researching Roman dining spaces, looking particularly at how they were decorated. This led to Dunbabin publishing a second book with Cambridge University Press, exploring how art can be used to give insight into social history. Dunbabin was a visiting fellow at All Souls College, Oxford between January and June 2001. In 2004, Dunbabin was awarded a Killam Fellowship so she could dedicate time to researching the role of theatre in Roman society and Roman art. The aim was to produce a book and deliver a series of public lectures on the topic. She retired from McMaster University in 2006.

Dunbabin has been part of the Journal of Roman Archaeology's editorial board since 2009.

== Publications ==
=== Books ===
- Dunbabin, Katherine (2016). Theater and Spectacle in the Art of the Roman Empire. Cornell University Press. ISBN 978-0-8014-5688-6. OL 27705528M. Wikidata Q61789061.
- Dunbabin, Katherine (2003), The Roman Banquet: Images of Conviviality, OL 20526120M, Wikidata Q59140723
- Dunbabin, Katherine (1999). Mosaics of the Greek and Roman World. Cambridge University Press. ISBN 978-0-521-00230-1. OL 376167M. Wikidata Q59140664.
- Dunbabin, Katherine (1978), The Mosaics of Roman North Africa. Studies in Iconography and Patronage, Clarendon Press, Wikidata Q61789711

=== Articles ===
- Dunbabin, Katherine (2017). "Athletes, acclamations, and imagery from the end of antiquity". Journal of Roman Archaeology. 30: 151–174. doi:10.1017/s1047759400074067. Wikidata Q43394127.
- Dunbabin, Katherine (2015). "The agonistic mosaic in the Villa of Lucius Verus and the Capitolia of Rome". Journal of Roman Archaeology. 28: 192–222. doi:10.1017/s1047759415002469. Wikidata Q55088136.
- Dunbabin, Katherine (2010). "The pantomime Theonoe on a mosaic from Zeugma". Journal of Roman Archaeology. 23: 413–426. doi:10.1017/s1047759400002488. Wikidata Q55079738.
- Dunbabin, Katherine (2008). "Domestic Dionysus? Telete in mosaics from Zeugma and the Late Roman Near East". Journal of Roman Archaeology. 21: 193–224. doi:10.1017/s104775940000444x. Wikidata Q55079651.
- Dunbabin, Katherine (2006). "A theatrical device on the Late Roman stage: the relief of Flavius Valerianus". Journal of Roman Archaeology. 19: 191–212. doi:10.1017/s1047759400006334. Wikidata Q55079580.
- Dunbabin, Katherine (1996). "Convivial spaces: dining and entertainment in the Roman villa". Journal of Roman Archaeology. 9: 66–80. doi:10.1017/s1047759400016500. Wikidata Q55079069.
- Dunbabin, Katherine (1993). "Wine and water at the Roman convivium". Journal of Roman Archaeology. 6: 116–141. doi:10.1017/s1047759400011508. Wikidata Q45749603.
- Dunbabin, Katherine (1993), The Use of Private Space, pp. 165–176, Wikidata Q47035588
- Dunbabin, Katherine (1990). "Ipsa deae vestigia... Footprints divine and human on Graeco-Roman monuments". Journal of Roman Archaeology. 3: 85–109. doi:10.1017/s1047759400010850. Wikidata Q43396488.
- Dunbabin, Katherine (1989). "Baiarum grata voluptas: pleasures and dangers of the Baths". Papers of the British School at Rome. 57: 6–46. doi:10.1017/s0068246200009077. Wikidata Q59397626.
- Dunbabin, Katherine (1979). "Technique and Materials of Hellenistic Mosaics". American Journal of Archaeology. 83 (3): 265. doi:10.2307/505057. JSTOR 505057. Wikidata Q57307626.
- Dunbabin, Katherine (1971). "The Triumph of Dionysus on Mosaics in North Africa". Papers of the British School at Rome. 39: 52–65. doi:10.1017/s0068246200007820. Wikidata Q59398762.
