= Journal of Roman Archaeology =

Academic journal

- Discipline: Roman archaeology
- Language: English, French, German, Italian, Spanish
- Edited by: Greg Woolf

Publication details
- History: 1988–present
- Publisher: Cambridge University Press (United Kingdom)
- Frequency: Annual

Standard abbreviations
- ISO 4: J. Rom. Archaeol.

Indexing
- ISSN: 1047-7594 (print); 2331-5709 (web)
- LCCN: 89656368
- OCLC no.: 802760662

Links
- Journal homepage

The Journal of Roman Archaeology is a peer-reviewed academic journal covering the archaeology of the Roman Empire. It was established in 1988 under the publisher and editor-in-chief J. H. Humphrey. The journal was originally published by the Department of Classical Studies at the University of Michigan and was favorably received. Since 2021, the journal has been published by Cambridge University Press. It is considered the pre-eminent academic journal in the field of Roman archaeology and was ranked as the fourth most impactful journal in Classics in 2023.

It is an international journal printing contributions in English, French, German, Italian, and Spanish; specializing in synthetic articles and in long reviews. Within three years of its inception in 1988, it was reviewed as a key publication for all Roman archaeologists, except 'those whose interests are decidedly parochial.'

The journal is concerned with Italy and all parts of the Roman world from about 700 B.C. to about A.D. 700. It excludes the prehistoric period but includes the Etruscan period. It is Mediterranean-wide in its coverage and does not give priority to any particular geographical regions within the Roman world.

In 2020 it was announced by Cambridge University Press that Jennifer Trimble (Stanford University) would assume the role of Senior Editor beginning with volume 34. Greg Woolf assumed the role in 2022.
