= Travel in classical antiquity =

Travel in classical antiquity over long distances was a specialised undertaking. Most travel was done in the interest of warfare, diplomacy, general state building, or trade. Social motivations for travel included visiting religious sites, festivals such as the Olympics, and health-related reasons. Most travel was difficult and expensive, due to the danger of violence, the scarcity of well-maintained roads, and the variability of travel times on water, as ancient ships were subject to the vagaries of both the wind and the tides.

Much of ancient literature is concerned with travel. The Odyssey relates the tale of Odysseus’ travel home to Ithaca over a ten-year period. The Aeneid tells the story of Aeneas' flight from Troy. Elsewhere, travel narratives from authors such as Herodotus and Caesar form more grounded examples of how individuals moved throughout the ancient world. Both Greek and Roman society had mores surrounding travel and the treatment of guests.

== Historical context ==
The Standard of Ur depicts both chariots and wagons

The first instances of long-distance travel in the broader Mediterranean world occurred in what are today Egypt and Iraq. In Egypt, the Nile served as a conduit for trade and transportation. In the Near East, river travel on the Tigris and Euphrates was supplemented by long-distance travel over land in wagon-like vehicles pulled by oxen. Later, the chariot developed. Originally reserved for royalty, chariots later became important in warfare. In the Near East, large but not particularly sophisticated systems of roads evolved. Later these systems would be connected and redeveloped by the Persians.

The primary motivation for the development of travel and infrastructure to support it in both Egypt and the Near East was conquest and subsequent rule, a trend that continued in Greece and Rome. There is evidence, however, of travel motivated by tourism in Egypt, with visitors and scribes coming to view and record the pyramids and other religious monuments.

== Maritime and river travel ==
The earliest maritime travel occurred on the Nile and other rivers in the Near East. Due to the lack of roads in ancient Greece, the most efficient way of shipping large amounts of goods, such as olive oil, was over the sea. Greek ships were built in varying sizes, with the largest accommodating as much as 500 tons of goods. Despite reliance on favourable weather, relatively little effort went into short sea voyages beyond the packing and management of the ship, although there was the danger of pirates and kidnapping for ransom.

For Romans, the seas were more or less clear of pirates due to the Roman military, although the fear of shipwreck by storm was greater, and often referenced in poetry and song. Passage by ship was considerably more pleasant than passage by land, but was not available throughout the year due to changes in tides and other weather conditions.

== Land travel ==
The earliest notable road system in the ancient Mediterranean world was the Royal Road. The most extensive incarnation of the system was unified and organized under Darius I, ruler of the Achaemenid Empire in the 5th century BCE. It was built from connecting and upgrading older systems, and was used to enable rapid communication and transportation throughout the empire, as well as the collection of taxes. Generally, other contemporary roads were not paved or well maintained, making land travel both on foot and horseback arduous and time-consuming.

=== Greece ===
Greek roads were poorly developed due to the fragmentation of Greek society at the state level, and due to the extreme cost of constructing roads in Greece's mountainous terrain. At least in Athens, when built, roads were funded through special taxes on wealthy. Some roads were difficult to traverse even on foot, and most could not be traversed with the heavy wagons built to haul goods. Notable exceptions were the roads between major cities and nearby sanctuaries and holy sites, which were built to endure all weather. However, no portion of the Greek highway system included state-sponsored way stations or milestones, as found later in Rome.

There was danger of violence on Greek roads. For the same reasons that roads in Greece were poorly and rarely constructed, there was essentially no oversight by official forces, and as such travelers were prone to being accosted by highwaymen. As such, having a large entourage was useful for protection, and the transportation of valuables was risky.

=== Rome ===
Roman roads were extensive, largely to facilitate the transportation of the military. They suffered from lack of maintenance, at least during the Roman Republic due to the fact that more visible projects (new city-centric construction, such as aqueducts, and arena games) took precedence. The roads were built with few resources and had to be built to function in a variety of geographical and seasonal conditions. As Roman roads radiated away from towns, they became less elaborate and were sometimes paved with gravel, or markers were used to illustrate the proper path. This lack of attention to detail is contrasted with the uniform stone highways that generally existed near major urban centers, typically built by soldiers overseen by army engineers. Romans tended to build their roads without curves as often as possible. Contrasted with Greece, the danger of violence was less pronounced on Roman roads, due to the strong centralized military present in Rome.

Due to the difficulty and stress of travel by land, few civilians chose to conduct long-distance travel or trade over Rome's roads. Instead, tax collectors, couriers, soldiers, and other government officials were primary users of the highway network.

== Mapmaking and itineraria ==
Scholars remain split as to whether or not the Greeks and Romans produced representative maps to serve as guides, and, if so, the level of their sophistication. Those who argue that there was no formal practice of cartography in the ancient world cite the lack of evidence, and the lack of materials that would have formed viable maps. Chinese contemporaries of the Romans did produce durable maps through their access to silk, a hardier material than those accessible in the Mediterranean world. Papyrus, the most likely Mediterranean candidate that could have been produced cheaply, was too sensitive, and would not have withstood long-term use. Other materials that might have been used (wood or vellum) have not survived; the only records that exist to this day are in the form of text, either as travelogues or descriptions of maps.

Without ready access to maps, both Greeks and Romans relied on itineraria to conduct sea travel, and the Romans used the documents for land travel as well. These documents were lists of cities or ports and the distances between them. Itineraria may have sometimes included crude illustrations, never to scale, to orient travelers as they moved through Roman or Greek territory. Extant examples, both saved by monastic copying traditions, include the Antonine Itinerary (which included roads in Britain) and the Tabula Peutingeriana (which may have been a guide for couriers, or a decoration).

=== Greek maps ===
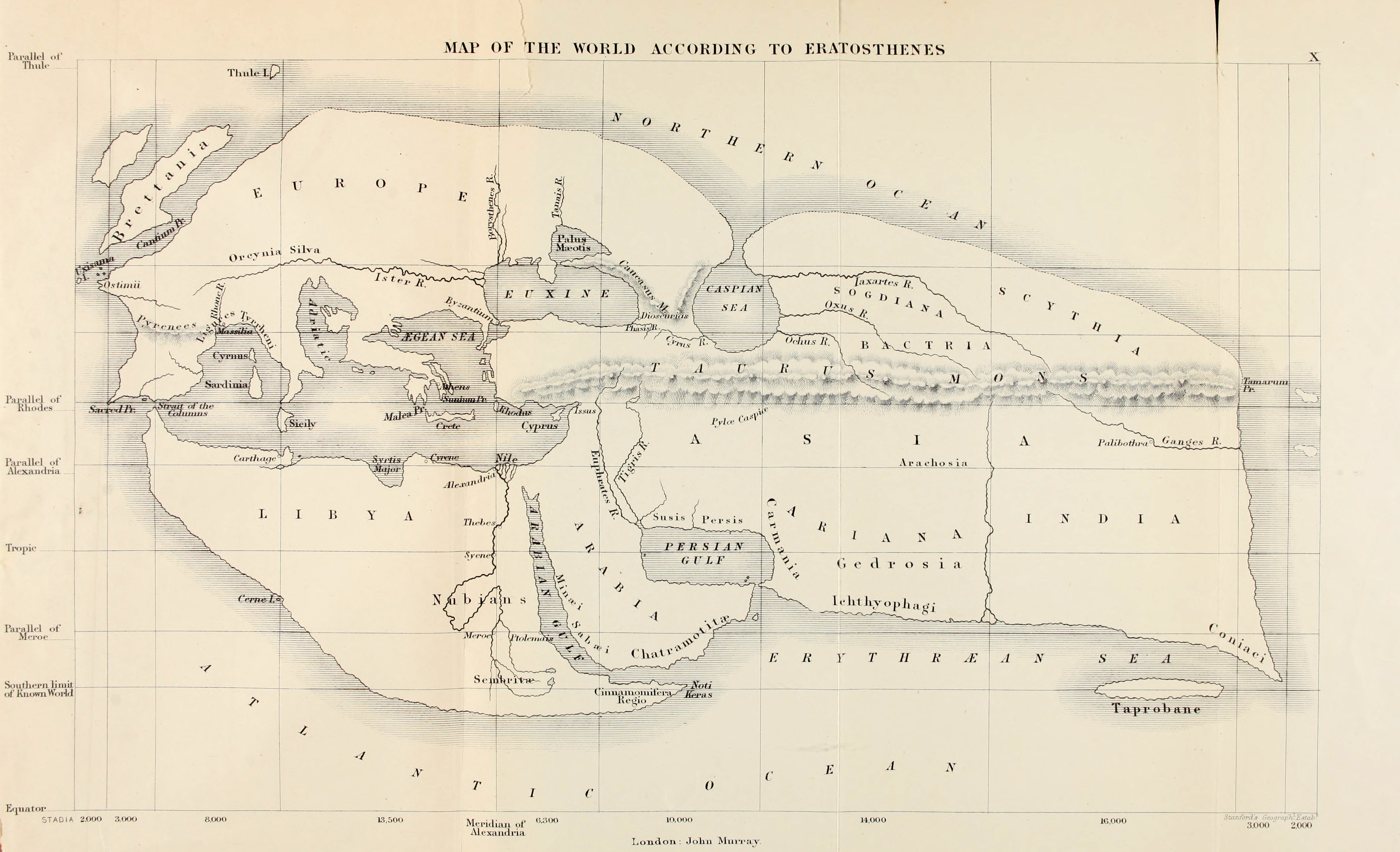
A 19th-century reconstruction of Eratosthenes' map of the oikoumene

Greek maps were often either localized, intended to demonstrate the shapes of specific cities, or to represent abstract concepts, such as the realm of the oikoumene, or known world. There are no extant Greek maps, but descriptions of one by Anaximander and others indicate that they split the oikoumene into continents—Europe, Asia, and Libya—within which there were further classifications. Divisions between continents and nations were often determined by bodies of water. Greek maps further separated the world into habitable and inhospitable zones, and some maps included the concept of the antipodes, an oikoumene in another habitable zone of the Earth not accessible with Greek transportation technologies.

Later Greek scientists determined that the Earth was round, although there was some debate as to the accuracy of this claim. During the conquests by Alexander the Great, Hellenistic knowledge of the world was expanded, resulting in an improved map of the world by Eratosthenes. He also calculated the circumference of the Earth, and published two treatises about geography, titled Geographica and On the Measurement of the Earth. Contemporaries of Eratosthenes questioned the validity of his methods, although his calculation of the Earth's circumference was quite accurate.

=== Roman maps ===
Like the Greeks, the Romans did not possess the materials or technology to produce useful maps. Several examples of what may have been Roman maps have been introduced through archaeology, although both their validity as maps and even their authenticity have been debated. Romans used itineraria in warfare, to guide government postal workers, and for civilian travel. Those that contained illustrations to underscore the text would not have been to scale, and would have borne more similarity to transit maps than contemporary to-scale maps. Although not used for travel, there is evidence of maps created after surveys by the Roman government, in a process known as centuriation in which the land was reduced to grids for cultivation.

== Travel narratives ==
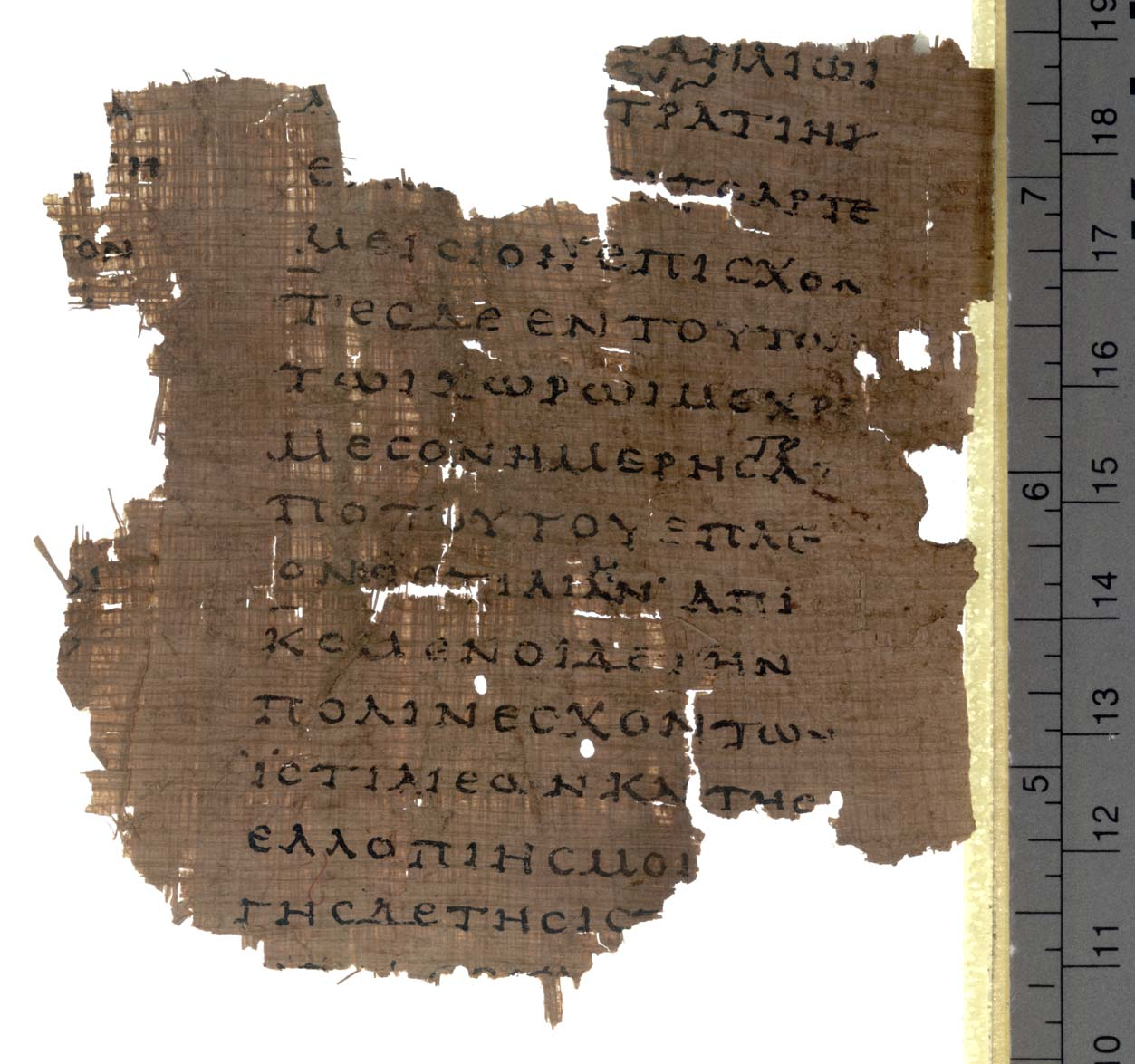
A fragment from the Histories VIII

Writings in Greek that could be qualified as travel narratives included Histories by Herodotus. Sections of the work are devoted to geographic and ethnographic descriptions of the territories encountered during his travels, which ranged from Egypt to the Persian Empire. Strabo also compiled his travels into a major work, Geographica, which outlined his conceptions of the world and the geographies of regions such as what are today Spain and India.

Narratives from Rome that include travel include Caesar's Commentarii de Bello Gallico, which describes Caesar's conquest of Gaul. Tacitus' Germania relies on information he gained from those who had journeyed to Germany, although he never did.

=== Paradoxography ===
Paradoxography is a genre of classical travel writing that recounts encounters with foreign or supernatural peoples, animals, and events. There were whole works devoted to such descriptions such as works by Palaephatus, and an otherwise anonymous Apollonius. Portions of other texts also include paradoxography in certain sections, including Commentarii de Bello Gallico, Histories, and certain versions of the Alexander Romance.

== Hospitality and lodgings ==
=== Greek hospitality and lodgings ===
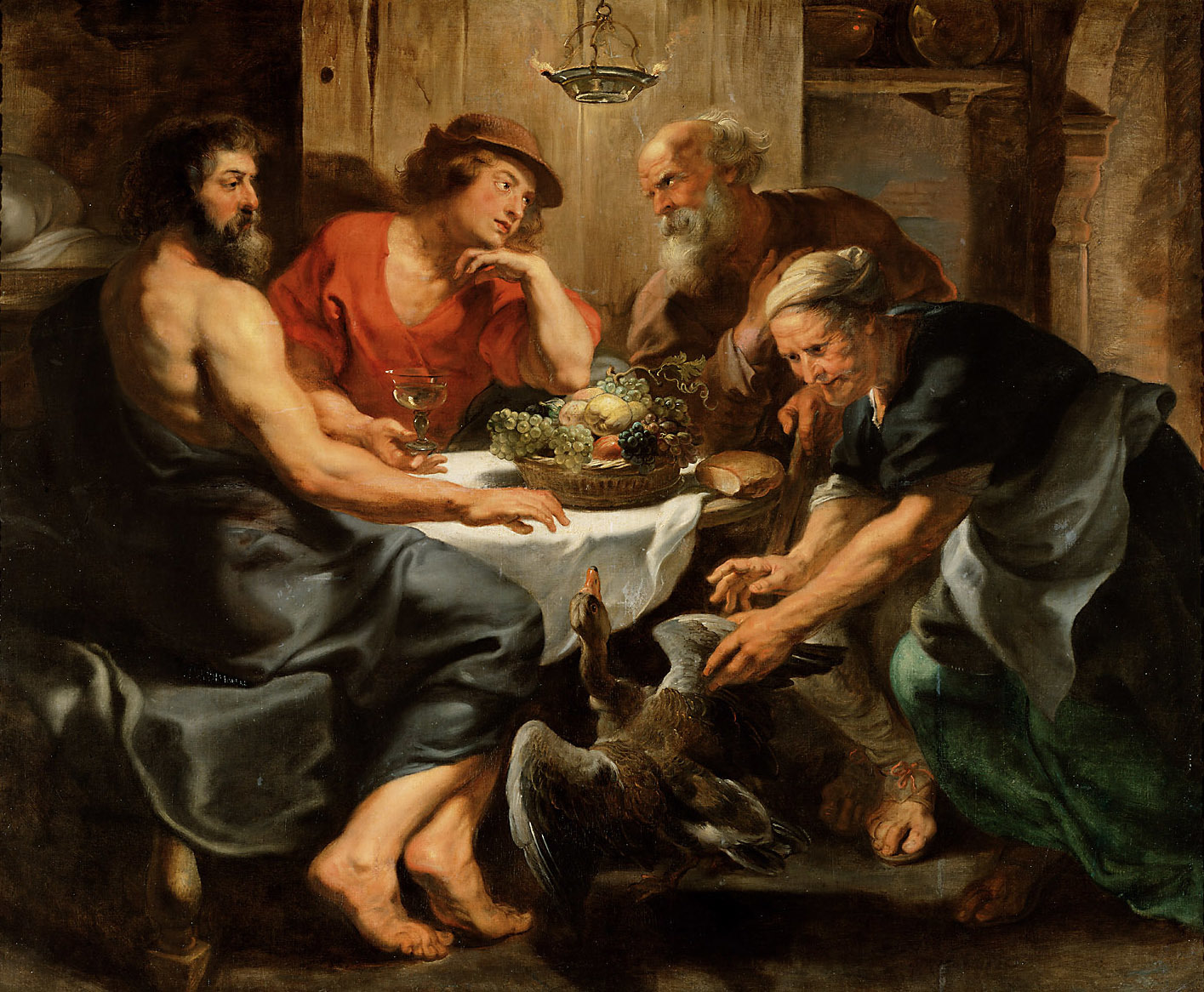
Jupiter and Mercurius in the House of Philemon and Baucis painted 1630–33 by Rubens

Greek hospitality demanded the fair treatment of guests and the reciprocal treatment of hosts, outlined in the concept of xenia. Xenia demanded both abstract respect as well as the exchange of material goods, such as gifts and food. Much of The Odyssey deals with Odysseus' treatment by guests, and his own violations of xenia. Xenia also appears in other Greek myths, such as that of Baucis and Philemon, in which a disguised Zeus and Hermes are given shelter and food by an elderly couple after their neighbors refused to accommodate the deities; the couple is subsequently rewarded.

In a non-mythological context, xenia provided for the equitable treatment of foreign dignitaries, traders, and guests while visiting alien city-states through the office of the proxenos. A proxenos was a city-appointed official, either a native or a resident alien, who would look over the citizens of a specific foreign city when they visited the city he represented. For example, a native citizen of Athens or a resident Corinthian would be appointed proxenos for visitors of Corinth in Athens, and was therefore responsible for both diplomacy between the two cities and the interests of Corinthian citizens in Athens. Looking after another city's citizens meant arranging for favors as mundane as obtaining theater tickets, to more complicated procedures, such as ensuring access to capital or an audience with city officials. In addition to cities, trade groups or other organizations might appoint a proxenos to ensure their clients were treated fairly during visits.

The office of proxenos was honorary, and came only with a title and the prestige associated with the appointment. Some scholarship suggests that although the proxenos was tasked with diplomacy, they also may have occasionally engaged in subterfuge or intelligence gathering in order to grant their native city the upper hand in conflicts.

There is little evidence of a formalized system of inns in Greek cities, although some have been found that served tourists during festivals. These were organized around a central courtyard, and would have provided stables as well as beds.

=== Roman hospitality and lodgings ===
Roman hospitality mores were less formalized than in Greek civilization, although it was informed by both xenia and the concept of hospitium, essentially a Romanized version of the earlier term. Rome and Roman cities had systems of inns within their walls, individually known as hospitium or deversorium. These were available to all, and offered services ranging from simple access to a place to sleep to restaurants and stables. Cheaper alternatives, known as caupona, catered to sailors and soldiers, and offered alcohol in a less formal restaurant setting, as well as prostitution. Generally, lining the roads outside major cities were other inns, known as stabulum, which appealed to travelers.

== Motivations ==
Ancient travel was motivated by reasons as diverse as trade (including postal communications), religious pilgrimages, warfare, and tourism.

=== Trade ===
Trade between different nations was an integral reason for travel. During the Roman Empire, trade was conducted with nations as disparate as China, India, and Tanzania. Generally, Roman and Chinese traders exchanged statues and other processed goods in exchange for Chinese silk. Trade in the city of Rome was focused around providing food for the city's massive population; as such, the trade of grain and other foods was subsidized by the government. Grain was brought into the city from all around empire: Egypt, Spain, Sardinia, and Sicily were all sources for the city.

Trade was sophisticated enough in Rome that a system similar to that of the proxenos emerged, with offices backed by different governments representing the interests of their private citizens in cities throughout the Mediterranean. These offices, like way stations along the Roman roads, were known as stationes.

=== Postal services ===
There were at least two postal services during the history of Rome—the cursus publicus and the agentes in rebus. Both were created during the Roman Empire, and both survived its dissolution, at least for a time. The established routes of the cursus publicus are sometimes argued to be outlined in the Tabula Peutingeriana, a surviving illustrated itineraria from the 4th century, although this claim is disputed. Both services existed to deliver messages (including military orders) and to collect taxes. Occasionally they also acted as spies and couriers for the military, collecting intelligence and delivering orders. Couriers relied on stationes (publicly funded way-stations) and mansiones (private residences) for shelter and food, and had the ability to compel private citizens to provide for them.

The cursus publicus differed from a conventional, modern postal service in that it was not universal (it was only available in more developed provinces) and in that deliveries were made at the government's discretion, rather than on a regular schedule. Usage of the system of lodgings and animals used by the service required official permission from the provincial governor, or the emperor. Governors acted as overseers for the system, and some public officials were also entitled to use it as a form of personal transportation.

=== Religion and health ===
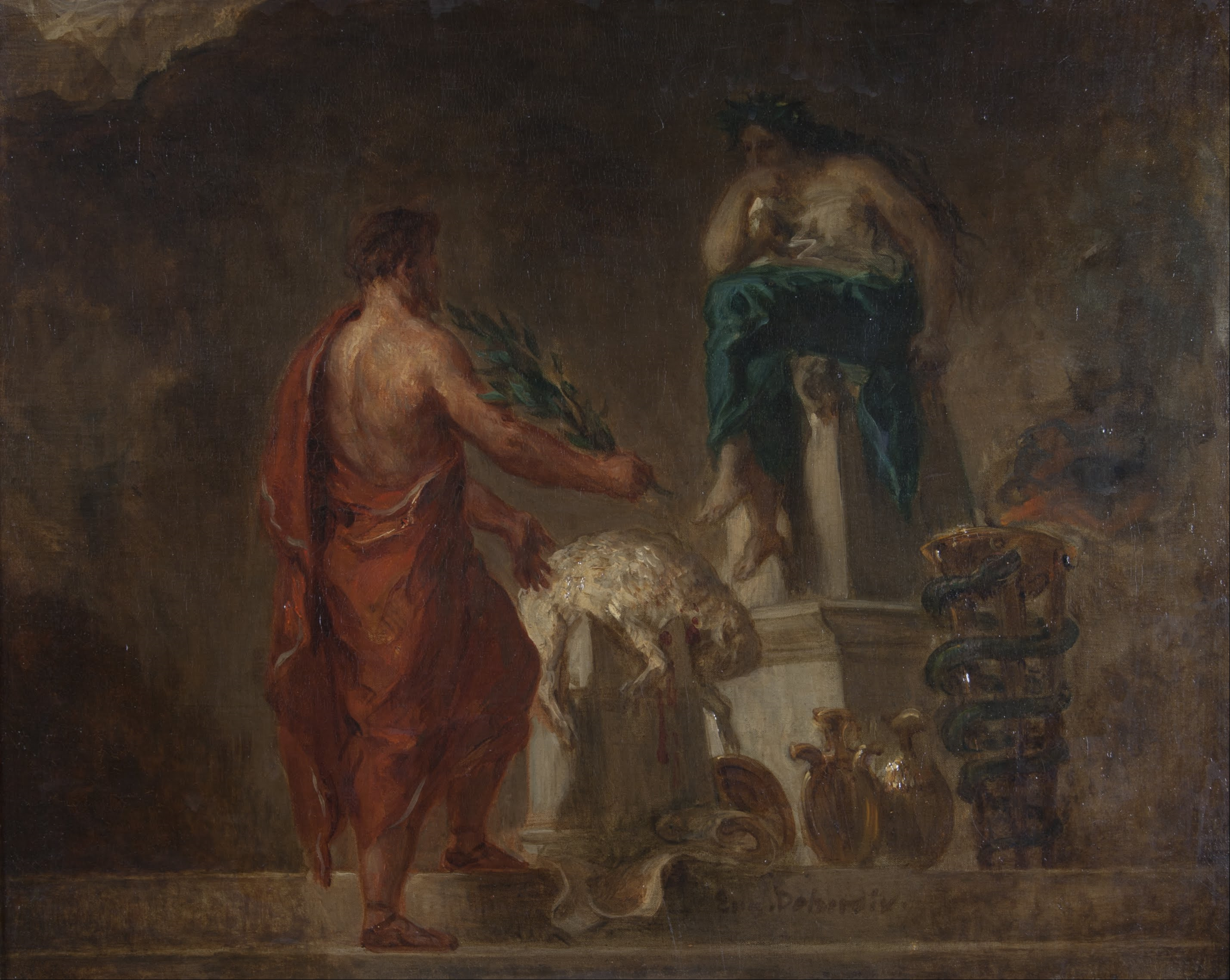
Lycurgus Consulting the Pythia (1835/1845), as imagined by Eugène Delacroix.

Pilgrimage to one of the major oracles was one of the central reasons for religious travel in the ancient world, particularly in Rome. These pilgrimages were generally made to oracles, such as that at Delphi, who was known as Pythia or simply the Oracle of Delphi, a title that passed to different women. Romans would have visited these oracles in the hopes of gaining some insight about their future. Generally, oracles were associated with a god. Pythia, for example, was associated with Apollo.

Health also played a role in motivating travel, both in Roman and Greek culture. Travelers visited sanctuaries associated with various deities, such as the Sanctuary of Asclepius at Epidauros, in the hopes of curing illness and disease. These sanctuaries would have sometimes also been associated with specific physicians. Galen, for example, was famously associated with the sanctuary of Asclepius. Sanctuary sites were often isolated, and included springs, as well as diversions, such as works of art and stadiums for athletic events. Other forms of travel in the name of health, such as journeys by ship, also existed.

==== Festivals ====
In Greco-Roman culture, festivals occurred either annually or every few years, and were held for religious reasons. Generally, they were held in fixed locations, and individuals traveled from city to city in order to attend. However, there were also universal festivals, occurring throughout Greece and Rome, and both universal and local festivals could be celebrated by citizens while abroad. The most popular of these festivals were the originally Greek games: the Pythian Games, the Isthmian Games, the Nemean Games, and, most famously, the Olympic Games. These revolved around the performance of artistic and athletic feats to honor individual deities, and continued to be celebrated after Rome's conquest of Greece.

Festivals served deliberately to motivate travel, with the purpose of not only asserting communal identity at the imperial or societal level, rather than the local level, but also promoting Greek and Roman culture as opposed to foreign or "barbaric" practices. The length of festivals rarely exceeded five days, while travel times could be measured in weeks or months.

Lodgings available to the general public at festivals ranged from crude huts or tents to elaborate inns reserved for the Greek and Roman elite. Traders and those with connections in other cities often stayed in private homes. The influxes of tourists, particularly in Athens, created temporary economies, with vendors, prostitutes, and guides providing goods and services to the visitors.

=== Tourism ===
In Rome, tourists traveled to beach and mountain side resorts for different periods of the year. It was not uncommon for even middle-class Romans to own multiple villas.

=== Warfare and settlements ===
Warfare and state building were the two most common reasons for travel by non-elite residents of Roman and Greek society. The pinnacle of travel in name of warfare in Hellenistic society was under Alexander, but his efforts to conquer the world were preceded by a general Greek and specifically Athenian colonial process that led to the foundation of cities throughout the Mediterranean. Warfare by Alexander led to the movement of Hellenistic peoples and culture as far east as India, with settlements in Afghanistan, Egypt, and elsewhere, and led to the establishment of several descendant kingdoms: the Seleucid Empire and Ptolemaic Egypt.

=== Immigration ===
Immigration was also a motivation for travel, particularly to large urban centers, including Rome itself. There were few restrictions (except in wartime) on the ability of individuals and families to migrate and subsequently settle in cities, and despite stratification, there was still some level of upward mobility in Roman society.

Archaeological evidence suggests that construction increased during times of heavy immigration, and that immigration increased during periods of conquest, and that it was at its lowest after the Sack of Rome by Alaric I.

== See also ==
- Appian Way
- Roman navy
