= Auxilia =

Non-citizen troops in the Imperial Roman army

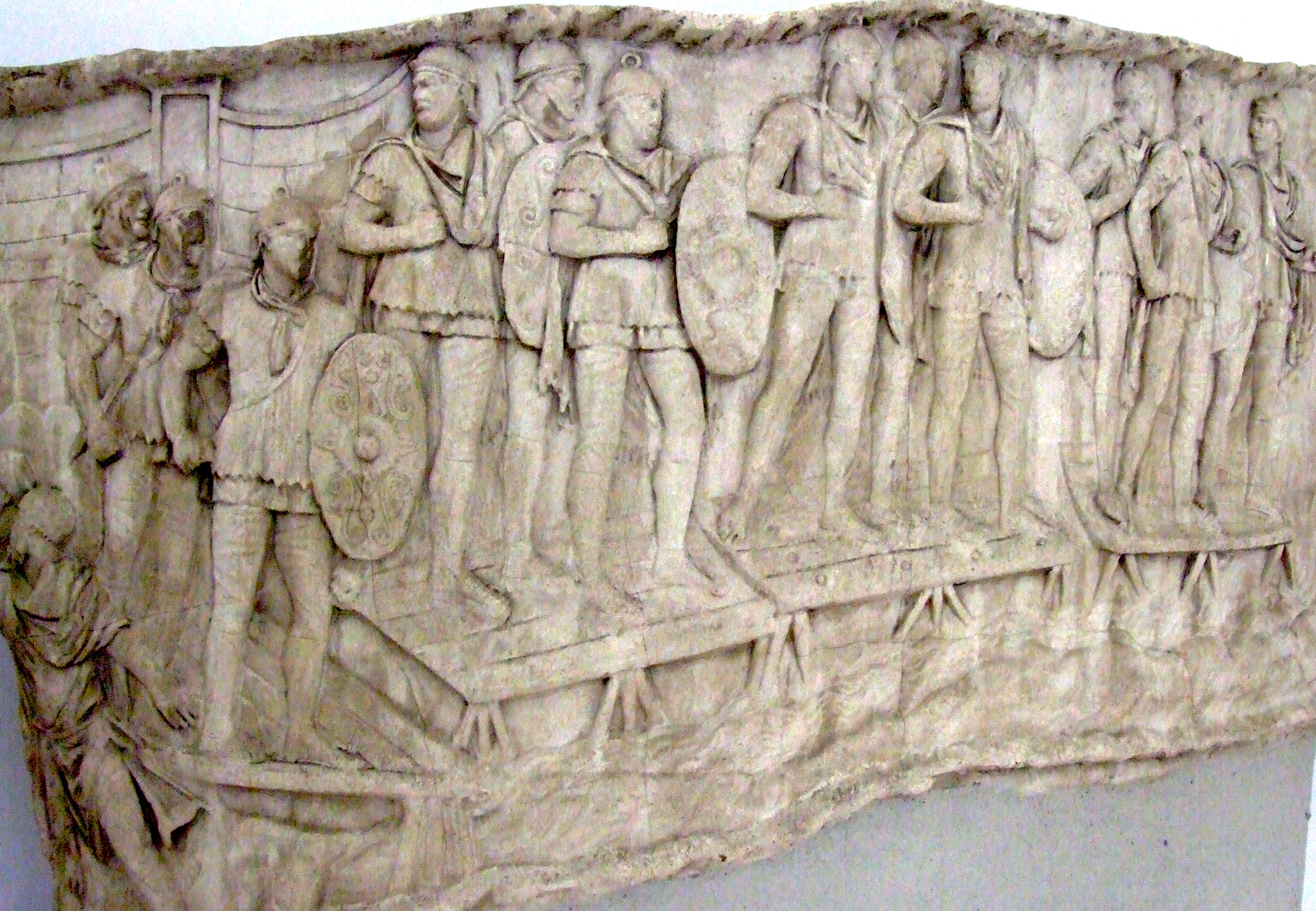
Roman auxiliary infantry crossing a river, probably the Danube, on a pontoon bridge during the emperor Trajan's Dacian Wars (101–106 AD). They can be distinguished by the oval shield (clipeus) they were equipped with, in contrast to the rectangular scutum carried by legionaries. Panel from Trajan's Column, Rome

The auxilia (Classical Latin: [au̯kˈsɪli.a], lit. 'auxiliaries') were introduced as non-citizen troops attached to the citizen legions by Augustus after his reorganisation of the Imperial Roman army from 27 BC. By the 2nd century, the Auxilia contained the same number of infantry as the legions and, in addition, provided almost all of the Roman army's cavalry (especially light cavalry and archers) and more specialised troops. The auxilia thus represented three-fifths of Rome's regular land forces at that time. Like their legionary counterparts, auxiliary recruits were mostly volunteers, not conscripts.

The Auxilia were mainly recruited from the peregrini, free provincial subjects who did not hold Roman citizenship and constituted the vast majority of the population in the 1st and 2nd centuries (c. 90% in the early 1st century). In contrast to the legions, which only admitted Roman citizens, members of the Auxilia could be recruited from territories outside of Roman control.

Reliance on the various contingents of non-Italic troops, especially cavalry, increased when the Roman Republic employed them in increasing numbers to support its legions after 200 BC. The Julio-Claudian period (27 BC–68 AD) saw the transformation of the Auxilia from motley levies to a standing corps with standardised structure, equipment and conditions of service. By the end of the period, there were no significant differences between legionaries and auxiliaries in terms of training and combat capability.

Auxiliary regiments were often stationed in provinces other than that in which they were originally raised, for reasons of security and to foster the process of Romanization in the provinces. The regimental names of many auxiliary units persisted into the 4th century, but by then the units in question were different in size, structure, and quality from their predecessors.

== Historical development ==
=== Background: Roman Republic (to 30 BC) ===
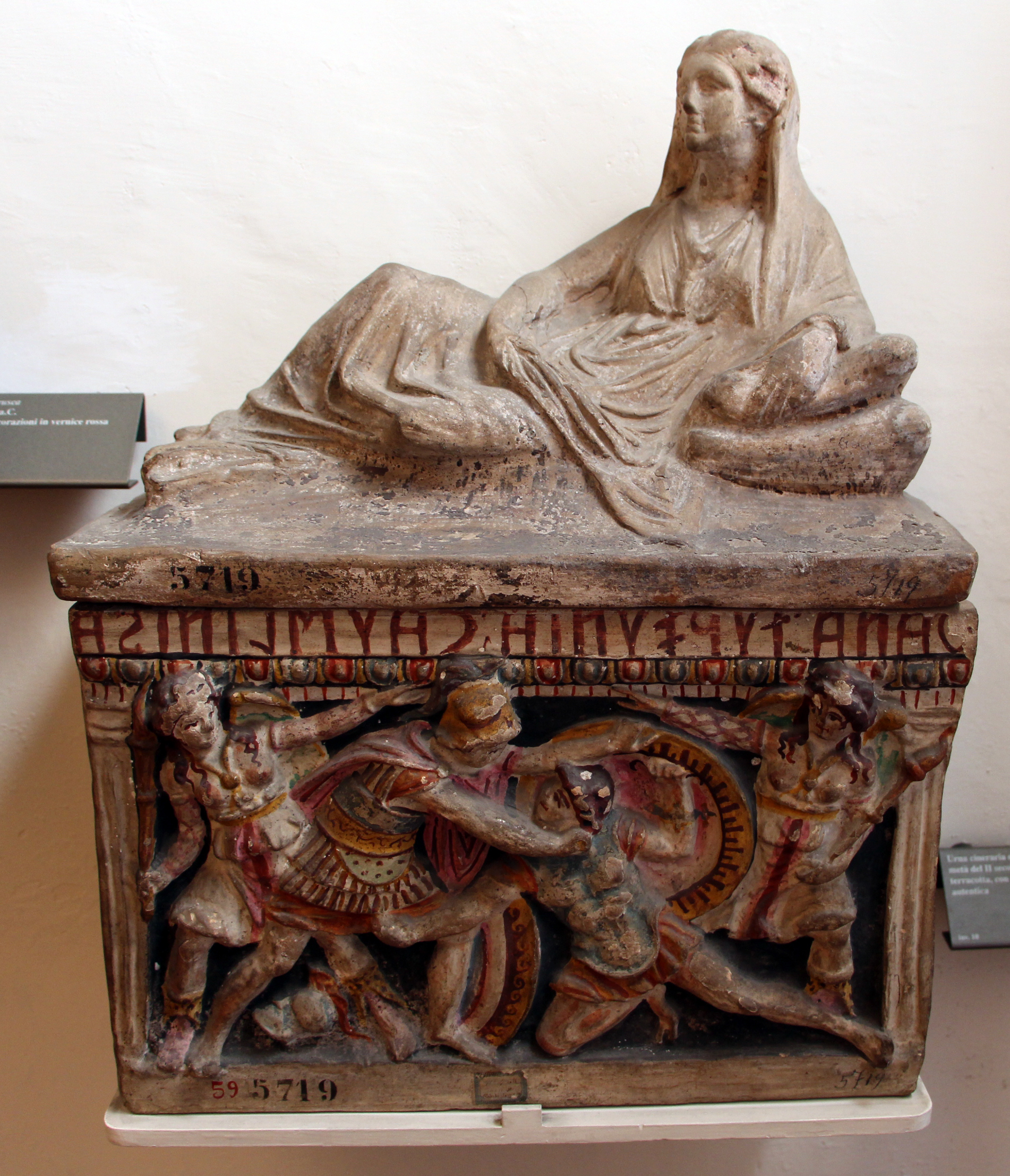
Etruscan funerary urn crowned with the sculpture of a woman and a front-panel relief showing two warriors fighting, polychrome terracotta, c. 150 BC

The mainstay of the Roman republic's war machine was the manipular legion, a heavy infantry unit suitable for close-quarter engagements on more or less any terrain, which was probably adopted sometime during the Samnite Wars (343–290 BC). Despite its formidable strength, the legion had a number of deficiencies, especially a lack of cavalry. Around 200 BC, a legion of 4,200 infantry had a cavalry arm of only 300 horse (just 7% of the total force). This was because the class of citizens who could afford to pay for their own horse and equipment – the equestrian order, the second rank in Roman society, after the senatorial order – was relatively small. In addition, the legion lacked missile forces such as slingers and archers. Until 200 BC, the bulk of a Roman army's cavalry was provided by Rome's regular Italian allies (socii), commonly known as the "Latin" allies, which made up the Roman military confederation. This was Rome's defence system until the Social War of 91–88 BC. The Italian forces were organised into alae (literally 'wings', because they were generally posted on the flanks of the Roman line of battle). An allied ala, commanded by three Roman praefecti sociorum, was similar or slightly larger in infantry size (4–5,000 men) to a legion, but contained a more substantial cavalry contingent: 900 horse, three times the legionary contingent. Since a pre-Social War consular army always contained an equal number of legions and alae, 75% of its cavalry was provided by the Latin allies. The overall cavalry element, c. 12% of the total force (2,400 out of a normal consular army of approximately 20,000 total effectives), was greater than in most peninsular Italian forces, but well below the overall 21% cavalry component that was typical of the Principate army (80,000 cavalry out of 380,000 total effectives in the early 2nd century).

The Roman/Latin cavalry was sufficient while Rome was in conflict with other states in the mountainous Italian peninsula, which also disposed of limited cavalry resources. But, as Rome was confronted by external enemies that deployed far more powerful cavalry elements, such as the Gauls and the Carthaginians, the Roman deficiency in cavalry numbers could be a serious liability, which in the Second Punic War (218–202 BC) resulted in crushing defeats. Hannibal's major victories at the Trebia and at Cannae, were owed to his Spanish and Gallic heavy cavalry, which far outnumbered the Roman and Latin levies, and to his Numidians, light, fast cavalry which the Romans wholly lacked. The decisive Roman victory at Zama in 202 BC, which ended the war, owed much to the Numidian cavalry provided by king Massinissa, which outnumbered the Roman/Latin cavalry fielded by two to one. From then, Roman armies were always accompanied by large numbers of non-Italian cavalry: Numidian light cavalry and, later, Gallic heavy cavalry. For example, Caesar relied heavily on Gallic and German cavalry for his Conquest of Gaul (58–51 BC).

As the role of native cavalry grew, that of Roman/Latin cavalry diminished. In the early 1st century BC, Roman cavalry was phased out altogether. After the Social War, the socii were all granted Roman citizenship, the Latin alae abolished, and the socii recruited into the legions. Furthermore, Roman equestrians were no longer required to perform cavalry service after this time. The late Republican legion was thus probably bereft of cavalry (a tiny cavalry force of 120 men was probably added back to the legion under Augustus).

By the outbreak of the Second Punic War, the Romans were remedying the legions' other deficiencies by using non-Italian specialised troops. Livy reports Hiero of Syracuse offering to supply Rome with archers and slingers in 217 BC. From 200 BC onwards, specialist troops were hired as mercenaries on a regular basis: sagittarii (archers) from Crete, and funditores (slingers) from the Balearic Isles almost always accompanied Roman legions in campaigns all over the Mediterranean.

The other main sources of non-Italian troops in the late Republic were subject provincials, allied cities and Rome's amici (satellite kings). During the late Republic, non-Italian units were led by their own native chiefs, and their internal organisation was left to their own commanders. The units varied widely in dress, equipment, and weapons. They were normally raised for specific campaigns and often disbanded soon afterwards, in a similar manner to the earlier socii militia legions.

=== Foundation of the auxilia under Augustus (30 BC–14 AD) ===
It appears that not all indigenous units were disbanded at the end of the civil war period (31 BC). Some of the more experienced units were kept in existence to complement the legions, and became the core of the standing auxiliary forces that developed in the Julio-Claudian period. During the early part of Augustus' rule (27 BC onwards), the corps of regular Auxilia was created. It was clearly inspired by the Latin forces of the pre-Social War Republic, as a corps of non-citizen troops parallel to the legions. But there were fundamental differences, the same as between Republican and Augustan legions. The Latin forces of the Republic were made up of part-time conscripts in units that would be raised and disbanded for and after particular campaigns. The Augustan Auxilia were mainly volunteer professionals serving in permanent units.

The unit structure of the Auxilia also differed from the Latin alae, which were like legions with a larger cavalry arm. However, Augustus organised the Auxilia into regiments the size of cohorts (a tenth the size of legions), due to the much greater flexibility of the smaller unit size. Further, the regiments were of three types: ala (cavalry), cohors (peditata) (infantry) and cohors equitata (mixed cavalry/infantry).

The evidence for the size of the Augustus' new units is not clear-cut, with our most precise evidence dating to the 2nd century, by which time the unit strengths may have changed. Cohortes were likely modelled on legionary cohorts i.e. six centuriae of about 80 men each (total about 480 men). Alae were divided into turmae (squadrons) of 30 (or 32) men, each under a decurio (literally: 'leader of ten'). This title derives from the old Roman cavalry of the pre-Social War republic, in which each turma was under the command of three decuriones. Cohortes equitatae were infantry cohortes with a cavalry contingent of four turmae attached.

Auxiliary regiments were now led by a praefectus (prefect), who could be either a native nobleman, who would probably be granted Roman citizenship for the purpose (e.g. the famous German war leader Arminius gained Roman citizenship probably by serving as an auxiliary prefect before turning against Rome); or a Roman, either of knightly rank, or a senior centurion.

At the start of Augustus' sole rule (30 BC), the original core auxiliary units in the West were composed of warlike tribesmen from the Gallic provinces (especially Gallia Belgica, which then included the regions later separated to form the provinces Germania Inferior and Germania Superior), and from the Balkan provinces (Dalmatia and Illyricum). By 19 BC, the Cantabrian and Asturian Wars were concluded, leading to the annexation of northern Hispania and Lusitania. Judging by the names of attested auxiliary regiments, these parts of the Iberian peninsula soon became a major source of recruits.

Then the Danubian regions were annexed: Raetia (annexed 15 BC), Noricum (16 BC), Pannonia (9 BC) and Moesia (6 AD), becoming, with Illyricum, the Principate's most important source of auxiliary recruits for its entire duration. In the East, where the Syrians already provided the bulk of the Roman army's archers, Augustus annexed Galatia (25 BC) and Judaea: the former, a region in central Anatolia with a Celtic-speaking people, became an important source of recruits. In N. Africa, Egypt, Cyrene, and Numidia (25 BC) were added to the empire. Numidia (modern day Eastern Algeria) was home to the Numidians/Moors, the ancestors of today's Berber people. Their light cavalry (equites Maurorum) was highly prized and had alternately fought and assisted the Romans for well over two centuries: they now started to be recruited into the regular Auxilia. Even more Mauri units were formed after the annexation of Mauretania (NW Algeria, Morocco), the rest of the Berber homeland, in 44 AD by emperor Claudius (ruled 41–54).

Recruitment was thus heavy throughout the Augustan period, with a steady increase in the number of units formed. By AD 23, the Roman historian Tacitus records that there were roughly the same numbers of auxiliaries in service as there were legionaries. Since at this time there were 25 legions of c. 5,000 men each, the Auxilia thus amounted to c. 125,000 men, implying c. 250 auxiliary regiments.

=== Illyrian revolt (6–9 AD) ===
During the early Julio-Claudian period, many auxiliary regiments raised in frontier provinces were stationed in or near their home provinces, except during periods of major crises such as the Cantabrian Wars, when they were deployed temporarily in theatre. This carried the obvious risk if their own tribe or ethnic group rebelled against Rome (or attacked the Roman frontier from outside the Empire), auxiliary troops could be tempted to make common cause with them. The Romans would then be faced by an enemy that included units fully equipped and trained by themselves, thus losing their usual tactical advantages over tribal foes.

The German leader Arminius is the classic example at an individual level: after several years of serving in Rome's forces as prefect of an auxiliary unit, he used the military training and experience he had gained to lead a confederacy of German tribes against Rome, culminating in the destruction of three Roman legions in the Teutoberg Forest in 9 AD, and the abandonment of Augustus' strategy of annexing Germany as far as the Elbe river. (This strategy was never revived by later emperors).

At a collective level, the risk was even greater, as the hugely dangerous Illyrian revolt proved. The central Illyrian tribes were tough and spartan shepherds of the Bosnian mountains and excellent soldier material. Their territory formed part of the strategic province of Illyricum, recently expanded to include the territory of the Pannonii, Celticised Illyrian tribes based on the west bank of the Danube who were subjugated by Rome in 12–9 BC (the Bellum Pannonicum). By the start of the Common Era, they were an important recruitment base for the auxilia. But discontent was festering among the Illyrian tribes, largely due to what they saw as the rapacity of Roman tax officials. In AD 6, several regiments of Dalmatae, a warlike Illyrian tribe, were ordered to report to a designated location to prepare to join Augustus' stepson and senior military commander Tiberius in a war against the Germans. Instead, they mutinied at the assembly point, and defeated a Roman force sent against them. The Dalmatae were soon joined by the Breuci, another Illyrian tribe that supplied several auxiliary regiments. They gave battle to a second Roman force from Moesia. They lost, but inflicted heavy casualties. The rebels were now joined by a large number of other Illyrian tribes. The Dalmatae attacked the port of Salona and overran the Adriatic coast, defeating a Roman force and exposing the Roman heartland of Italy to the fear of a rebel invasion.

Augustus ordered Tiberius to break off operations in Germany and move his main army to Illyricum. When it became clear that even Tiberius' forces were insufficient, Augustus was obliged to raise a second task force under Tiberius' nephew Germanicus, resorting to the compulsory purchase and emancipation of thousands of slaves to find enough troops, for the first time since the aftermath of the Battle of Cannae over two centuries earlier. The Romans had now deployed no less than 15 legions and an equivalent number of auxilia. This amounts to a total of c. 150,000 men, including at least 50 auxiliary cohorts composed, exceptionally, of Roman citizens. These were men whose status or background was regarded by Augustus as unsuitable for recruitment into the legions: either natural-born citizens of the lowest category, including vagrants and convicted criminals, or the freed slaves (Roman law accorded citizenship to the freed slaves of Roman citizens). These special units were accorded the title civium Romanorum ('of Roman citizens'), or c.R. for short. After the Illyrian revolt, these cohorts remained in being and recruited non-citizens like other auxiliary units, but retained their prestigious c.R. title. In addition, the regular forces were assisted by a large number of allied troops from neighbouring Thrace deployed by their king Rhoemetalces I, a Roman amicus (puppet king).

The Romans faced further reverses on the battlefield and a savage guerrilla war in the Bosnian mountains. It took them three years of hard fighting to quell the revolt, which was described by the Roman historian Suetonius, writing in c. AD 100, as the most difficult conflict faced by Rome since the Punic Wars over two centuries earlier. Tiberius finally succeeded in quelling the revolt in 9 AD. This was apparently lucky timing for the Romans: that same year Arminius destroyed Varus' three legions in Germany. The Roman high command had no doubt that Arminius would have formed a grand alliance with the Illyrians.

Despite the gravity of this rebellion, the Illyrians went on, alongside their neighbours the Thracians, to become the backbone of the Roman army. By the 2nd century, with roughly half the Roman army deployed on the Danube frontier, the auxilia and legions alike were dominated by Illyrian recruits. In the 3rd century, Illyrians largely replaced Italians in the senior officer echelons of praefecti of auxiliary regiments and tribuni militum of legions. Finally, from AD 268 to 379, virtually all emperors, including Diocletian and Constantine the Great, were Romanised Illyrians from the provinces of Dalmatia, Moesia Superior and Pannonia. These were members of a military aristocracy, outstanding soldiers who saved the empire from collapse in the turbulent late 3rd century.

=== Later Julio-Claudians (14–68 AD) ===
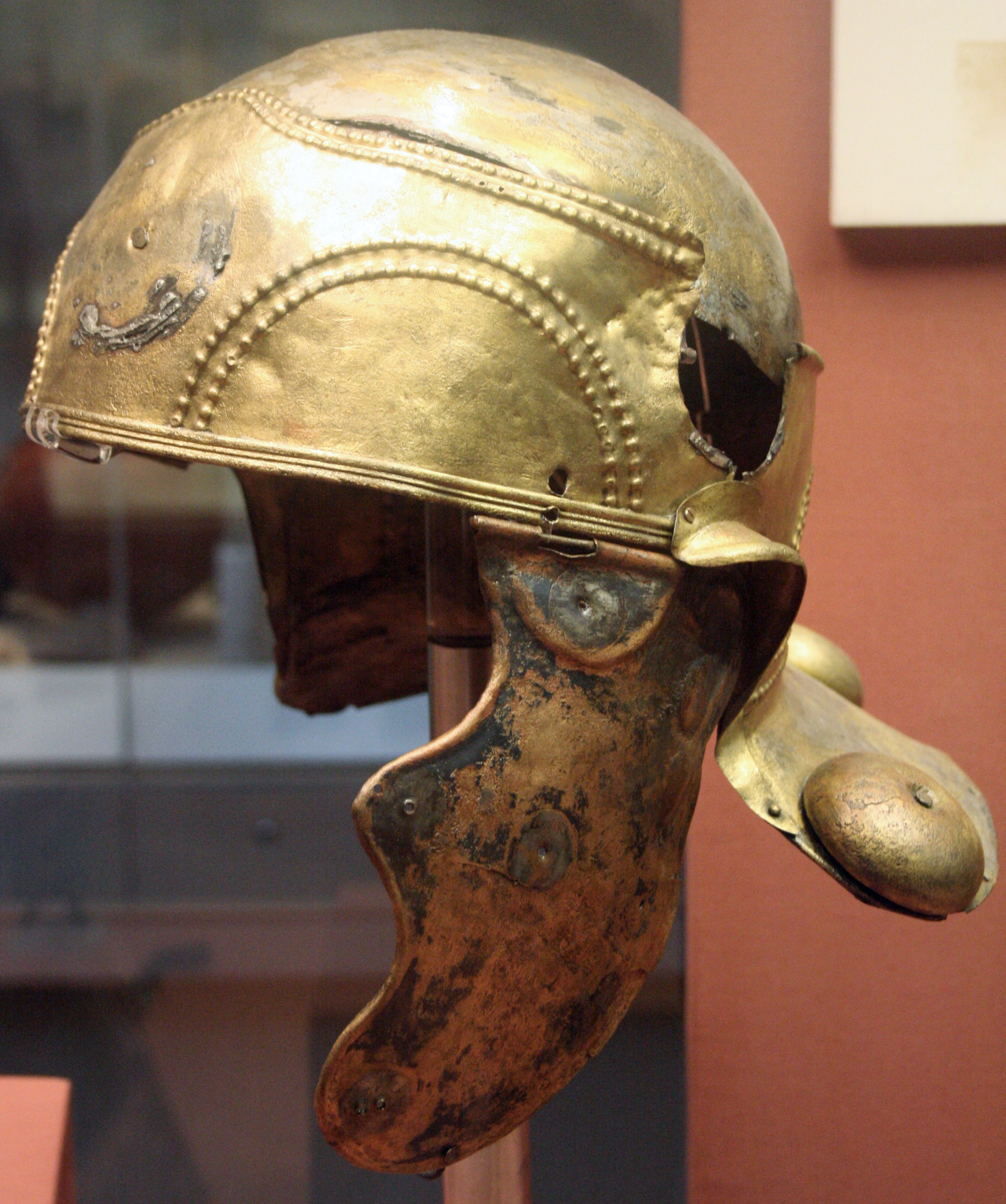
The cavalry Witcham Gravel helmet from Cambridgeshire (England), 1st century AD

Significant development of the Auxilia appears to have taken place during the rule of the emperor Claudius (41–54 AD).

A minimum term of service of 25 years was established, at the end of which the retiring auxiliary soldier, and all his children, were awarded Roman citizenship. This is deduced from the fact that the first known Roman military diplomas date from the time of Claudius. This was a folding bronze tablet engraved with the details of the soldier's service record, which he could use to prove his citizenship. Claudius also decreed that prefects of auxiliary regiments must all be of equestrian rank, thus excluding centurions from such commands. The fact that auxiliary commanders were now all of the same social rank as most tribuni militum, (military tribunes, a legion's senior staff officers, all of whom only one, the tribunus laticlavius, was of the higher senatorial rank), probably indicates that auxilia now enjoyed greater prestige. Indigenous chiefs continued to command some auxiliary regiments, and were probably granted equestrian rank for the purpose. It is also likely that auxiliary pay was standardised at this time, but estimates exist only for the Julio-Claudian period.

Auxiliary uniform, armour, weapons and equipment were probably standardised by the end of the Julio-Claudian period. Auxiliary equipment was broadly similar to that of the legions (see Section 2.1 below for possible differences in armour). By 68 AD, there was little difference between most auxiliary infantry and their legionary counterparts in equipment, training and fighting capability. The main difference was that auxilia contained combat cavalry, both heavy and light, and other specialized units that legions lacked.

Claudius annexed to the empire three regions that became important sources of auxiliary recruits: Britannia (43 AD), and the former client kingdoms of Mauretania (44) and Thracia (46). The latter became as important as Illyria as a source of auxiliary recruits, especially cavalry and archers. Britain in mid-2nd century contained the largest number of auxiliary regiments in any single province: about 60 out of about 400 (15%). By the rule of Nero (54–68), auxiliary numbers may have reached, by one estimate, about 200,000 men, implying about 400 regiments.

=== Revolt of the Batavi (69–70 AD) ===
Rhine frontier of the Roman Empire, 70 AD, showing the location of the Batavi in the Rhine delta region. Roman territory is shaded dark. Their homeland was called the Insula Batavorum by the Romans and corresponded roughly with modern Gelderland province, Neth. Their chief town was Noviomagus (Nijmegen, Neth.), a strategic prominence in an otherwise flat and waterlogged land that became the site of a Roman legionary fortress (housing the legion X Gemina) after the Batavi revolt ended in 70 AD. The name is of Celtic origin, meaning 'new market', suggesting that the Germanic Batavi either displaced or subjugated an indigenous Gallic tribe

The Batavi, a Germanic tribe, inhabited the region today known as Gelderland (Netherlands), in the Rhine river delta, then known as the Insula Batavorum ('Island of the Batavi', because it is surrounded by branches of the Rhine), part of the Roman province of Germania Inferior. They were a warlike people, skilled horsemen, boatmen and swimmers. In return for the unusual privilege of exemption from tributum (direct taxes on land and heads normally exacted from peregrini), they supplied a disproportionate number of recruits to the Julio-Claudian auxilia: one ala and eight cohortes. They also provided most of Augustus' elite personal bodyguard unit (the Germani corpore custodes), which continued in service until 68 AD. The Batavi auxilia amounted to about 5,000 men, implying that during the entire Julio-Claudian period, over 50% of all Batavi males reaching military age (16 years) may have enlisted in the auxilia. Thus the Batavi, although just 0.05% of the total population of the empire of c. 70 million in 23 AD, supplied about 4% of the total auxilia i.e. 80 times their proportionate share. They were regarded by the Romans as the very best (fortissimi, validissimi) of their auxiliary, and indeed all, their forces. In Roman service, both their cavalry and infantry had perfected a technique for swimming across rivers wearing full armour and weapons.

Julius Civilis (lit. 'Julius the Citizen', clearly a Latin name adopted on gaining Roman citizenship, not his native one) was a hereditary prince of the Batavi and the prefect of a Batavi cohort. A veteran of 25 years' service, he had distinguished himself by service in Britain, where he and the eight Batavi cohorts had played a crucial role in both the Roman invasion in 43 AD and the subsequent subjugation of southern Britain.

By 69, however, Civilis, the Batavi regiments and the Batavi people had become utterly disaffected with Rome. After the Batavi regiments were withdrawn from Britain to Italy in 66, Civilis and his brother (also a prefect) were arrested by the governor of Germania Inferior on a fabricated accusation of sedition. The governor ordered his brother's execution, while Civilis, who as a Roman citizen had the right to appeal to the emperor, was sent to Rome in chains for judgement by Nero. He was released by Nero's overthrower and successor, Galba, but the latter also disbanded the imperial bodyguard unit for their loyalty to Nero. This alienated several hundred crack Batavi troops, and indeed the whole Batavi nation who regarded it as a grave insult. At the same time, relations collapsed between the Batavi cohorts and the legion to which they had been attached since the invasion of Britain 25 years earlier (XIV Gemina). Their mutual hatred erupted in open fighting on at least two occasions.

At this juncture, the Roman empire was convulsed by its first major civil war since the Battle of Actium exactly a century earlier: the Year of the Four Emperors (69–70 AD). The governor of Germania Inferior, ordered to raise more troops, outraged the Batavi by attempting to conscript more Batavi than the maximum stipulated in their treaty. The brutality and corruption of the Roman recruiting-centurions (including incidents of sexual assault on Batavi young men) brought already deep discontent in the Batavi homeland to the boil.

Civilis now led his people in open revolt. Initially, he claimed he was supporting the bid for power of Vespasian, the general in command of the legions in Syria, whom Civilis had probably befriended when both were involved in the Roman invasion of Britain 25 years earlier (Vespasian was then commander of the legion II Augusta). But the uprising soon became a bid for independence. Civilis exploited the fact that some legions were absent from the Rhine area due to the civil war, and the rest under-strength. In addition, the Roman commanders and their rank-and-file soldiers were divided by loyalty to rival emperors. Civilis quickly won the support of the Batavi's neighbours and kinsmen, the Cananefates, who in turn won over the Frisii. First the rebel allies captured two Roman forts in their territory, and a cohort of Tungri defected to Civilis. Then two legions sent against Civilis were defeated when their companion Batavi ala defected to his side. The Classis Germanica (Rhine flotilla), largely manned by Batavi, was seized by Civilis. Most importantly, the eight Batavi cohorts stationed at Mainz with XIV Gemina mutinied and joined him, defeating at Bonn a Roman force that attempted to block their return to their homeland. By now, Civilis commanded at least 12 regiments (6,000 men) of Roman-trained and equipped auxiliary troops, as well as a much larger number of tribal levies. A number of German tribes from beyond the Rhine joined his cause. Several other German and Gallic units sent against him deserted, as the revolt spread to the rest of Gallia Belgica, including the Tungri, Lingones and Treviri tribes. He was able to destroy the two remaining legions in Germania Inferior, (V Alaudae and XV Primigenia).

By this stage, Rome's entire position on the Rhine and even in Gaul was imperiled. Their civil war over, the Romans mustered a huge task force of eight legions (five dispatched from Italy, two from Spain and one from Britain) to deal with Civilis. Its commander Petillius Cerialis had to fight two difficult battles, at Trier and Xanten, before he could overrun the Batavi's homeland. Tacitus' surviving narrative breaks off as he describes a meeting on an island in the Rhine delta between Civilis and Cerialis to discuss peace terms. We do not know the outcome of this meeting or Civilis' ultimate fate. But, in view of his former friendship with Vespasian, who had already offered him a pardon, and the fact that the Romans still needed the Batavi levies, it is likely that the terms were lenient by Roman standards.

Petilius Cerialis took a number of reconstituted Batavi units with him to Britain, and the Batavi regiments continued to serve with special distinction in Britain and elsewhere for the rest of the 1st century and beyond. Even as late as 395, units with the Batavi name, although long since composed of recruits from all over the empire, were still classified as elite palatini, e.g. the equites Batavi seniores (cavalry) and auxilium Batavi seniores (infantry).

=== Flavian era (69–96 AD) ===
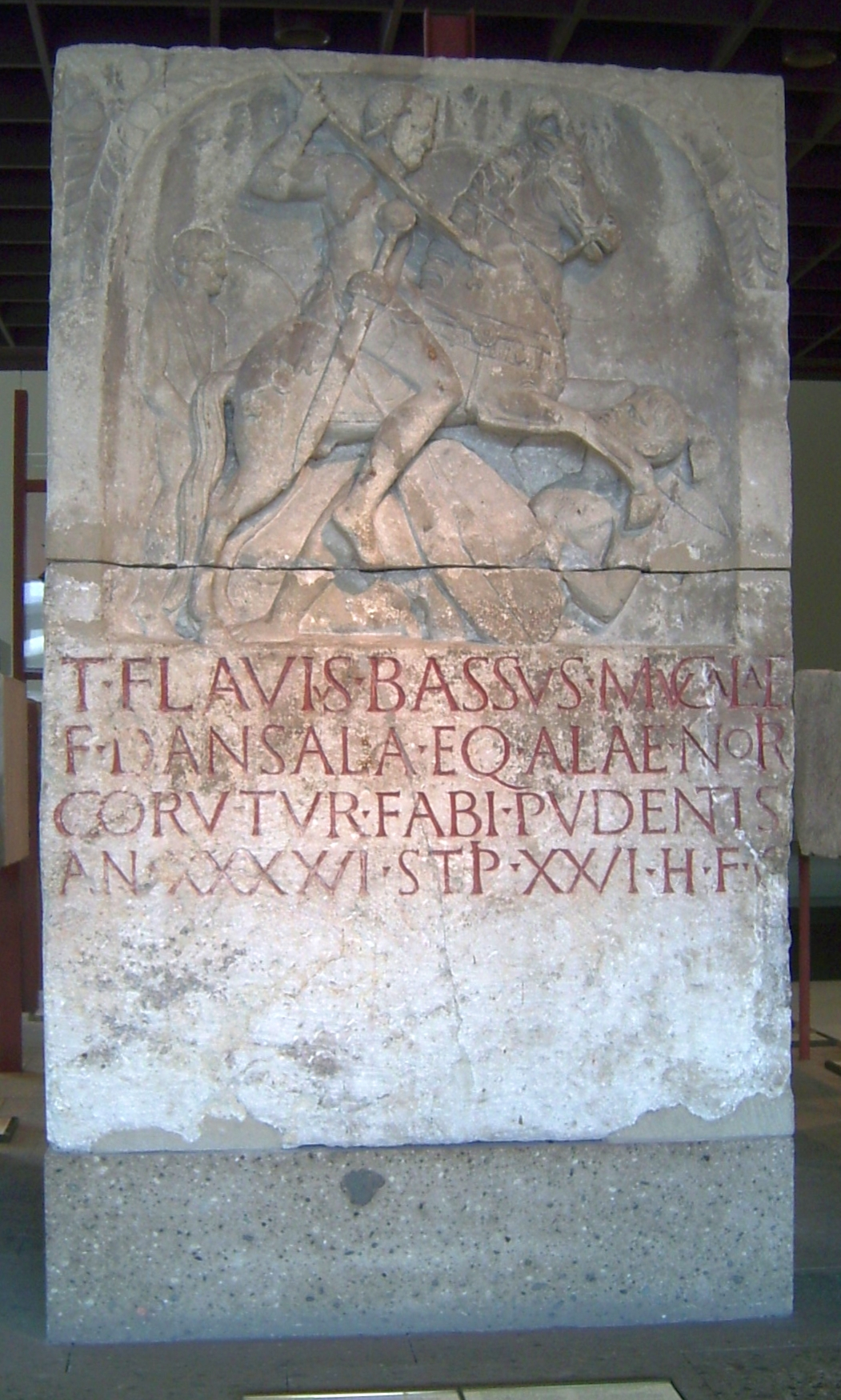
Tombstone of the Flavian-era eques alaris (ala cavalryman) Titus Flavius Bassus, son of Mucala. A Dansala, (i.e. member of the Thracian Dentheletae tribe), he belonged to the Ala Noricorum (originally raised from the Taurisci tribe of Noricum). He died at age 46 after 26 years' service, not having advanced beyond the lowest rank. Bassus' adopted Roman names, Titus Flavius, indicate that he had gained Roman citizenship, doubtless by serving the required 25 years in the auxilia. The names adopted would normally be those of the emperor ruling at the time of the citizenship award. In this case, they could refer to any of the three emperors of the Flavian dynasty (ruled 69–96), Vespasian and his two sons, Titus and Domitian, all of whom carried the same names. The arrangement of the scene, a rider spearing a man (the motif of the Thracian Hero), indicates that Bassus was a Thracian, as does his father's name. Date: late 1st century. Römisch-Germanisches Museum, Cologne, Germany

The revolt of the Batavi appears to have led to a significant change in the Roman government's policy on deployment of Auxilia. The revolt proved that in times of civil strife, when legions were far from their bases campaigning for rival claimants to the imperial throne, it was dangerous to leave provinces exclusively in the hands of auxiliary regiments recruited from the indigenous nation. During the Julio-Claudian period, auxiliary regiments had often been deployed away from their original home province. But in the Flavian period (69–96), this appears to have become standard policy. Thus in AD 70, five reconstituted Batavi regiments (one ala and four cohortes) were transferred to Britain under Petillius Cerialis, who had suppressed the Civilis revolt and then embarked on the governorship of the island. The great majority of regiments probably founded in the 1st century were stationed away from their province of origin in the second e.g. of 13 British regiments recorded in the mid-2nd century, none were stationed in Britain. Furthermore, it appears that in the Flavian era native noblemen were no longer permitted to command auxiliary units from their own tribe.

After a prolonged period in a foreign province a regiment would become assimilated, since the majority of its new recruits would be drawn from the province in which it was stationed, or neighbouring provinces. Those same "British" units, mostly based on the Danube frontier, would by c. 150, after almost a century away from their home island, be largely composed of Illyrian, Thracian and Dacian recruits. However, there is evidence that a few regiments at least continued to draw some recruits from their original home provinces in the 2nd century e.g. Batavi units stationed in Britain.

The Flavian period also saw the first formation of large, double-size units, both infantry and cavalry, of a nominal strength of 1,000 men (cohors/ala milliaria), though they were actually mostly smaller (720 for an ala milliaria and 800 for a cohors milliaria). These were the mirror image of the double-strength first cohorts of legions also introduced at this time. Such units remained a minority of the Auxilia: in the mid-2nd century, they constituted 13% of units, containing 20% of total manpower.

=== Later Principate (97–284) ===
In 106 AD, emperor Trajan finally defeated the Dacian kingdom of Decebalus and annexed it as the Roman province of Dacia Traiana. By the mid-2nd century, there were 44 auxiliary regiments stationed there, about 10% of the total auxilia. In Britain, there were 60. Together, these two provinces contained about a quarter of the total auxiliary regiments.

There is considerable scholarly dispute about the precise size of the auxilia during the imperial era, even during the corp's best-documented period, the rule of Trajan's successor, Hadrian (117–138). This is evident if one compares calculations by Spaul (2000) and Holder (2003):

Estimates of Roman auxilia numbers (units attested in the mid-2nd century)
Author	No. alae	No. cohortes	Total no. units	Total cavalry	Total infantry	Total effectives
J. Spaul (2000)	80	247	327	56,160	124,640	180,800
P. A. Holder (2003)	88	279	367	74,624	143,200	217,624

NOTE: Manpower figures exclude officers (centurions and decurions), which would have numbered about 3,500 men overall.

In addition, Holder believes that a further 14 cohortes, which are attested under Trajan, immediately before Hadrian's rule, but not during or after it, probably continued in existence, giving a total of 381 units and 225,000 effectives. The discrepancy between the two scholars is due to: (i) Interpretation of units with the same name and number, but attested in different provinces in the same period. Spaul tends to take a more cautious approach and to assume such are the same unit moving base frequently, while Holder tends to regard them as separate units which acquired the same number due to duplicated (or even triplicated) seriation. (ii) Assumptions about how many cohortes were equitatae. Spaul accepts only those cohortes specifically attested as equitatae i.e., about 40% of recorded units. Holder estimates that at least 70% of cohortes contained cavalry contingents by the early 2nd century.

Even according to the more conservative estimate, the auxilia were by this time significantly larger than the legions, which contained c. 155,000 effectives (28 legions of 5,500 men each) at this time, of which just 3,360 were cavalry. (For a detailed breakdown, see section 4: Auxilia deployment in the 2nd century, below).

During the second half of the 2nd century, the Roman army underwent considerable further expansion, with the addition of five new legions (27,500 men) to a Principate peak of 33. A matching number of auxilia (i.e. c. 50 regiments, although only the names of around 25–30 have survived in the epigraphic record) were probably added, possibly reaching a peak of c. 440 regiments and around 250,000 effectives by the end of Septimius Severus's rule (211 AD).

The likely growth of the Roman auxilia may be summarised as follows:

Estimated size of Roman army 24–305 AD
Army corps	Tiberius 24 AD	Hadrian c. 130 AD	S. Severus 211 AD	3rd-century crisis c. 270 AD	Diocletian 284–305
Legions	125,000	155,000	182,000		
Auxilia	125,000	218,000	250,000		
Praetorian Guard	~~5,000	~~8,000	~15,000		
Total Roman Army	255,000	381,000	447,000	290,000?	390,000

NOTE: Regular land forces only. Excludes citizen-militias, barbarian foederati, and Roman navy effectives

During the 2nd century, some units with the new names numerus ('group') and vexillatio ('detachment') appear in the diploma record. Their size is uncertain, but was likely smaller than the regular alae and cohortes, as originally they were probably detachments from the latter, acquiring independent status after long-term separation. As these units are mentioned in diplomas, they were presumably part of the regular auxiliary organisation. But numeri was also a generic term used for barbarian units outside the regular auxilia. (see section 2.4 Irregular units, below).

In 212, the constitutio Antoniniana (Antonine decree) of emperor Caracalla granted Roman citizenship to all the free inhabitants of the Empire – the peregrini – thus abolishing their second-class status. But there is no evidence that the citizens-only rule for legions was also abolished at this time. The legions simply gained a much wider recruitment base, as they were now able to recruit any male free resident of the empire. Auxiliary units were now recruited mainly from Roman citizens, but probably continued to recruit non-citizen barbari from outside the Empire's borders. However, the citizens-only rule for legions appears to have been dropped some time during the 3rd century, as by the 4th-century Romans and barbarians are found serving together in all units.

In the mid to late 3rd century, the army was afflicted by a combination of military disasters and of pestilence, the so-called Crisis of the Third Century. In 251–271, Gaul, the Alpine regions and Italy, the Balkans and the East were simultaneously overrun by Alamanni, Sarmatians, Goths and Persians respectively. At the same time, the Roman army was struggling with the effects of a devastating pandemic, probably of smallpox: the Plague of Cyprian, which began in 251 and was still raging in 270, when it claimed the life of emperor Claudius II Gothicus. The evidence for an earlier pandemic, the Antonine Plague (also smallpox) indicates a mortality of 15–30% in the empire as a whole. The armies would likely have suffered deaths at the top end of the range, due to their close concentration of individuals and frequent movements across the empire. This probably led to a steep decline in military numbers, which only recovered at the end of the century under Diocletian (r. 284–305).

The recruitment shortfall caused by the crisis seems to have led to recruitment of barbarians to the auxilia on a much greater scale than previously. By the 4th century, it has been estimated that some 25% of regular army recruits were barbarian-born. In the elite palatini regiments, anywhere between a third and a half of recruits may have been barbarian. This is likely a much greater proportion of foreigners than joined the auxilia in the 1st and 2nd centuries. In the 3rd century, a small number of regular auxiliary units appear in the record that, for the first time, bear the names of barbarian tribes from outside the empire e.g. the ala I Sarmatarum attested in 3rd-century Britain. This was probably an offshoot of the 5,500 surrendered Sarmatian horsemen posted on Hadrian's Wall by emperor Marcus Aurelius in c. 175. This unit may be an early example of a novel process whereby irregular units of barbari (foederati) were transformed into regular auxilia. This process intensified in the 4th century: the Notitia Dignitatum, a key document on the late Roman army, lists a large number of regular units with barbarian names.

=== 4th century ===
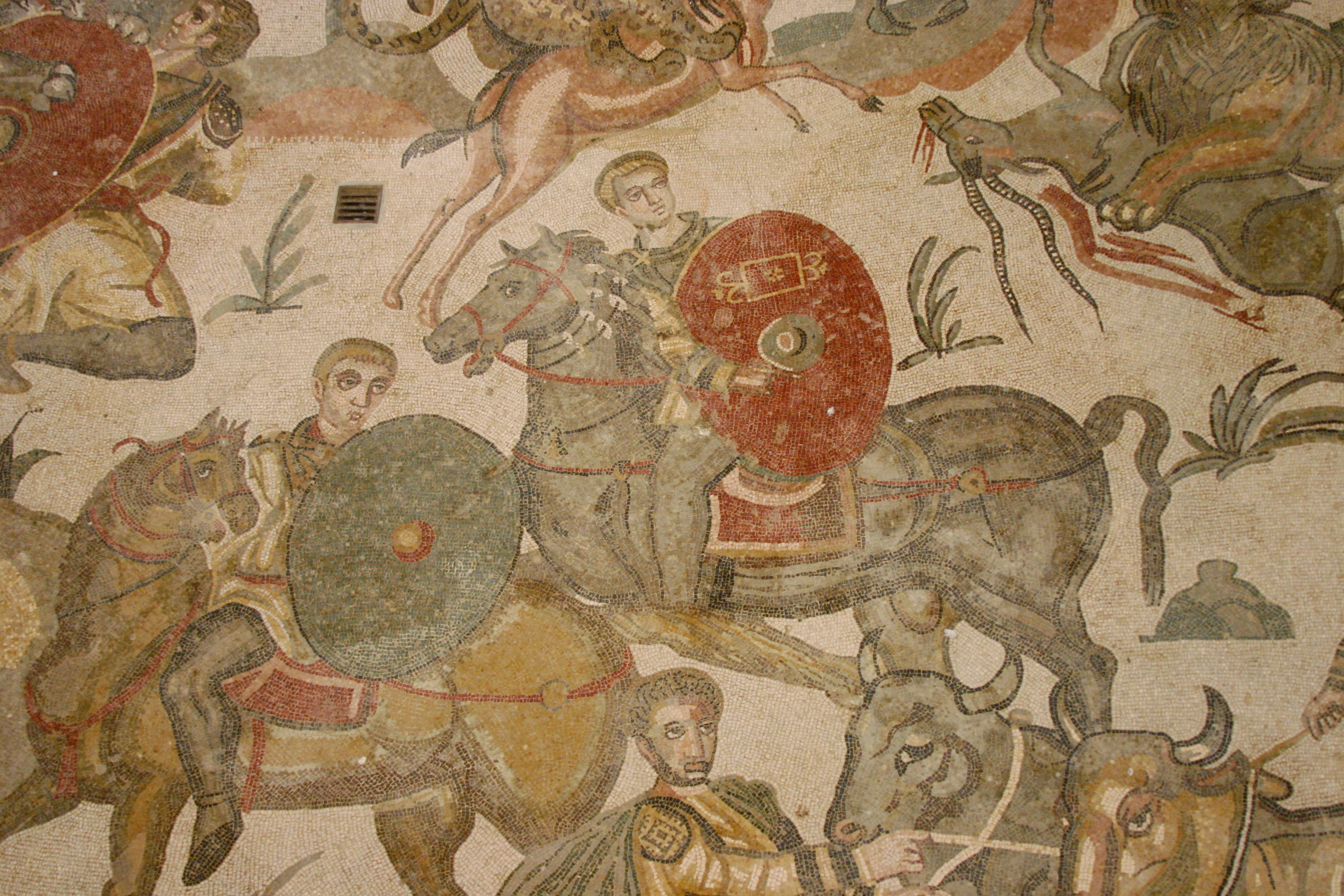
Roman cavalry from a mosaic of the Villa Romana del Casale, Sicily, 4th century AD

In the 4th century, the Roman army underwent a radical restructuring. In the rule of Diocletian (284–305), the traditional Principate formations of legiones, alae and cohortes appear to have been broken up into smaller units, many of which bore a variety of new names. Under Constantine I (r. 312–337) it appears that military units were classified into three grades based on strategic role and to some extent quality: palatini, elite units normally part of the exercitus praesentales (imperial escort armies); comitatenses, higher-grade interception forces based in frontier provinces; and limitanei, lower-grade border troops. (See Late Roman army).

The old Principate auxilia regiments provided the basis for units at all three grades. The Notitia Dignitatum lists about 70 alae and cohortes that retained their 2nd-century names, mostly limitanei. But traces of other auxilia regiments can be found in the praesentales and comitatenses armies. For example, many of the new-style auxilia palatina infantry regiments, considered among the best units in the army, were probably formed from old-style auxiliary cohortes, which they appear to closely resemble.

The late 4th-century writer on military affairs Vegetius complains of contemporary young men joining the "auxilia" in preference to the "legions" to avoid the latter's tougher training and duties. But it is unclear what types of units he was referring to. It is possible that those older terms were still popularly used (misleadingly) to mean limitanei and comitatenses respectively. In any event, his quote in no way describes accurately the Principate auxilia, many of which were of very high quality.

== Unit types and structure ==
=== Regular unit types ===
The following table sets out the official, or establishment, strength of auxiliary units in the 2nd century. The real strength of a unit would fluctuate continually, but would likely have been somewhat less than the establishment most of the time.

Roman auxiliary regiments: Type, structure and strength
Unit type	Service	Unit commander	Sub-unit commander	No of sub-units	Sub-unit strength	Unit strength
Ala quingenaria	cavalry	praefectus	decurio	16 turmae	30 (32)	480 (512)
Ala milliaria	cavalry	praefectus	decurio	24 turmae	30 (32)	720 (768)
Cohors quingenaria	infantry	praefectus*	centurio	6 centuriae	80	480
Cohors milliaria	infantry	tribunus militum**	centurio	10 centuriae	80	800
Cohors equitata quingenaria	infantry plus cavalry contingent	praefectus	centurio (inf) decurio (cav)	6 centuriae 4 turmae	80; 30.	600 (480 inf/120 cav)
Cohors equitata milliaria	infantry plus cavalry contingent	tribunus militum**	centurio (inf) decurio (cav)	10 centuriae 8 turmae	80; 30	1,040 (800 inf/240 cav)

* tribunus militum in original c.R. cohortes
** praefectus in Batavi and Tungri cohortes milliariae

NOTE: Opinion is divided about the size of an ala turma, between 30 and 32 men. 30 was the size of a turma in the Republican cavalry and in the cohors equitata of the Principate auxilia. Against this is a statement by Arrian that an ala was 512 strong. This would make an ala turma 32 men strong.

==== Cohortes ====
These all-infantry units were modeled on the cohorts of the legions, with the same officers and sub-units. They were typically considered to be more of a light infantry than proper legionaries. Some auxiliaries may however have been equipped with the lorica segmentata, the most sophisticated legionary body armour, although scholars dispute this. Besides this possibility, monuments (like on Trajan's Column) show auxiliaries wearing chain-mail armor, the length and form of which varied over the first and second century. They wore helmets similar to those of the Legion. Yet they seem to be simplified versions that were further improved over the same timeframe. They were equipped with a sword, a dagger and one or more spears or javelins. This spear might have been a lancea, which can be used as a javelin as well as a thrusting spear. Based on archeological evidences auxiliaries probably had additional lighter javelins to their lancea. The shield of the auxiliaries was oval.

There is no evidence that auxiliary infantry fought in a looser order than legionaries. It appears that in a set-piece battle line, auxiliary infantry would normally be stationed on the flanks, with legionary infantry holding the centre e.g. as in the Battle of Watling Street (AD 60), the final defeat of the rebel Britons under queen Boudicca. This was a tradition inherited from the Republic, when the precursors of auxiliary cohortes, the Latin alae, occupied the same position in the line. The flanks of the line required equal, if not greater, skill to hold as the centre.

==== Alae ====
During the Principate period of the Roman Empire (30 BC – AD 284), the all-mounted Alae ('wings') contained the elite cavalry of the army. They were specially trained in elaborate manoeuvres, such as those displayed to the emperor Hadrian during a documented inspection in Numidia. They were best-suited for large-scale operations and battle, during which they acted as the primary cavalry escort for the legions, which had almost no cavalry of their own. Roman alares were normally armoured, with mail or scale body armour, a cavalry version of the infantry helmet (with more protective features, such as completely covered ears) and oval shield or hexagonal. Their weapons could be a lance, javelins, or bow and arrow but all Roman horseman had a sword (called a spatha) and a dagger (the pugio). The elite status of an alaris is shown by the fact that he received 20% more pay than his counterpart in an auxiliary cohort or a legionary infantryman.

The favored sources of recruitment for the cavalry of the auxilia were Gauls, Germans, Iberians and Thracians. All of these peoples had long-established skills and experience of fighting from horseback – in contrast to the Romans themselves. The alae were better paid and mounted than the more numerous horsemen of the cohortes equitatae (see below).

==== Cohortes equitatae ====
These were cohortes with a cavalry contingent attached. There is evidence that their numbers expanded with the passage of time. Only about 40% of attested cohortes are specifically attested as equitatae in inscriptions, which is probably the original Augustan proportion. A study of units stationed in Syria in the mid-2nd century found that many units that did not carry the equitata title did in fact contain cavalrymen e.g. by discovery of a tombstone of a cavalryman attached to the cohort. This implies that by that time, at least 70% of cohortes were probably equitatae. The addition of cavalry to a cohort obviously enabled it to carry out a wider range of independent operations. A cohors equitata was in effect a self-contained mini-army.

The traditional view of equites cohortales (the cavalry arm of cohortes equitatae), as expounded by G.L. Cheesman, was that they were just a mounted infantry with poor-quality horses. They would use their mounts simply to reach the battlefield and then would dismount to fight. This view is today discredited. Although it is clear that equites cohortales did not match equites alares (ala cavalrymen) in quality (hence their lower pay), the evidence is that they fought as cavalry in the same way as the alares and often alongside them. Their armour and weapons were the same as for the alares.

Nevertheless, non-combat roles of the equites cohortales differed significantly from the alares. Non-combat roles such as despatch riders (dispositi) were generally filled by cohort cavalry.

=== Auxiliary specialised units ===
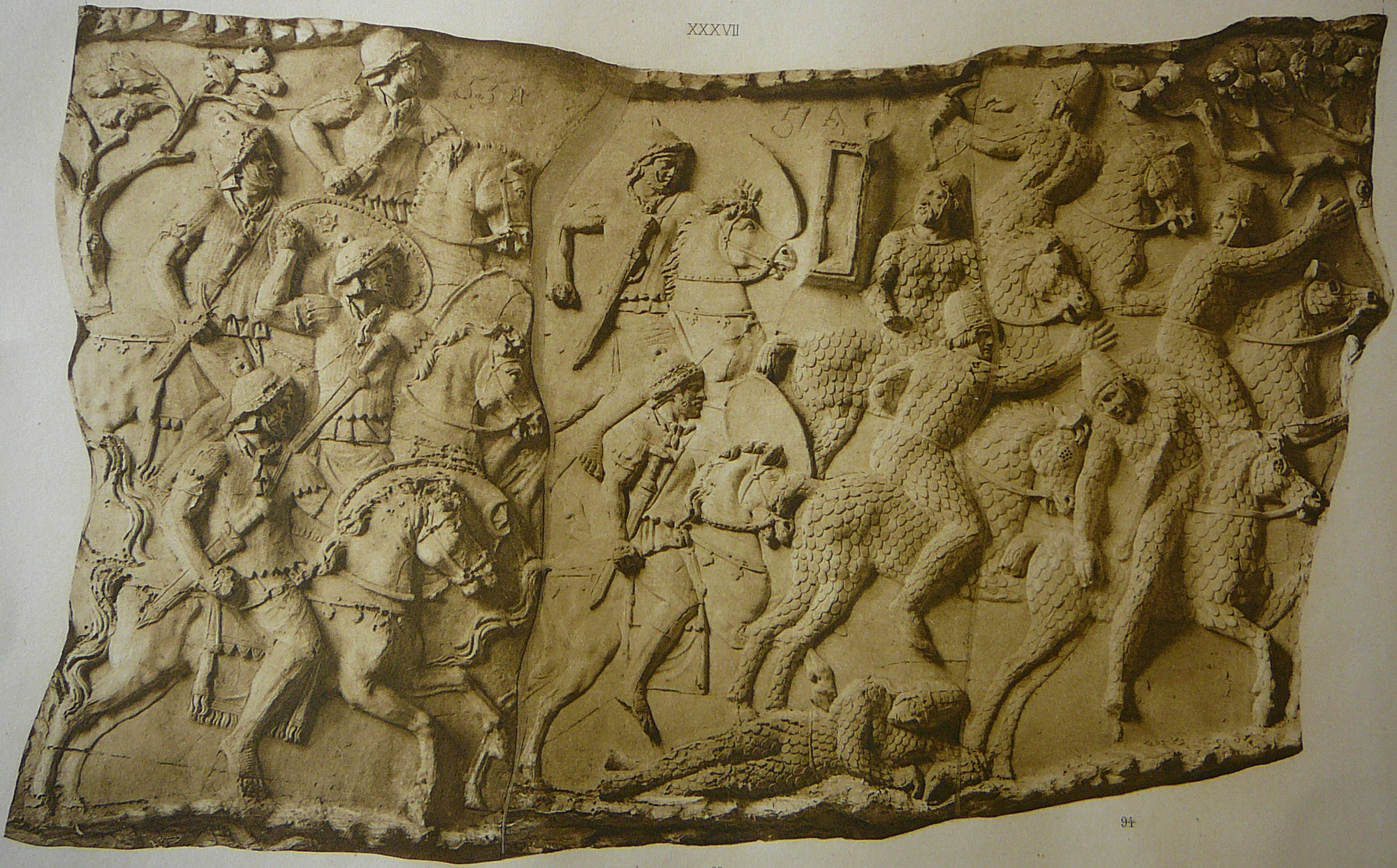
Routed Sarmatian cataphracts (right) flee for their lives from Roman alares (auxiliary cavalrymen), during the Dacian Wars (AD 101–106). Note full-body scalar armour, also armoured caparison for horses (including eye-guards). The Sarmatians' lances (as well as the Romans') have disappeared due to stone erosion, but a sword is still visible, as is a bow carried by one man. It was apparently in the period following this conflict (perhaps as a result of the lessons learnt from it) that the Romans first established their own regular units of cataphracts, and deployed them in the Danubian region. They were most likely equipped as the Sarmatians. Panel from Trajan's Column, Rome

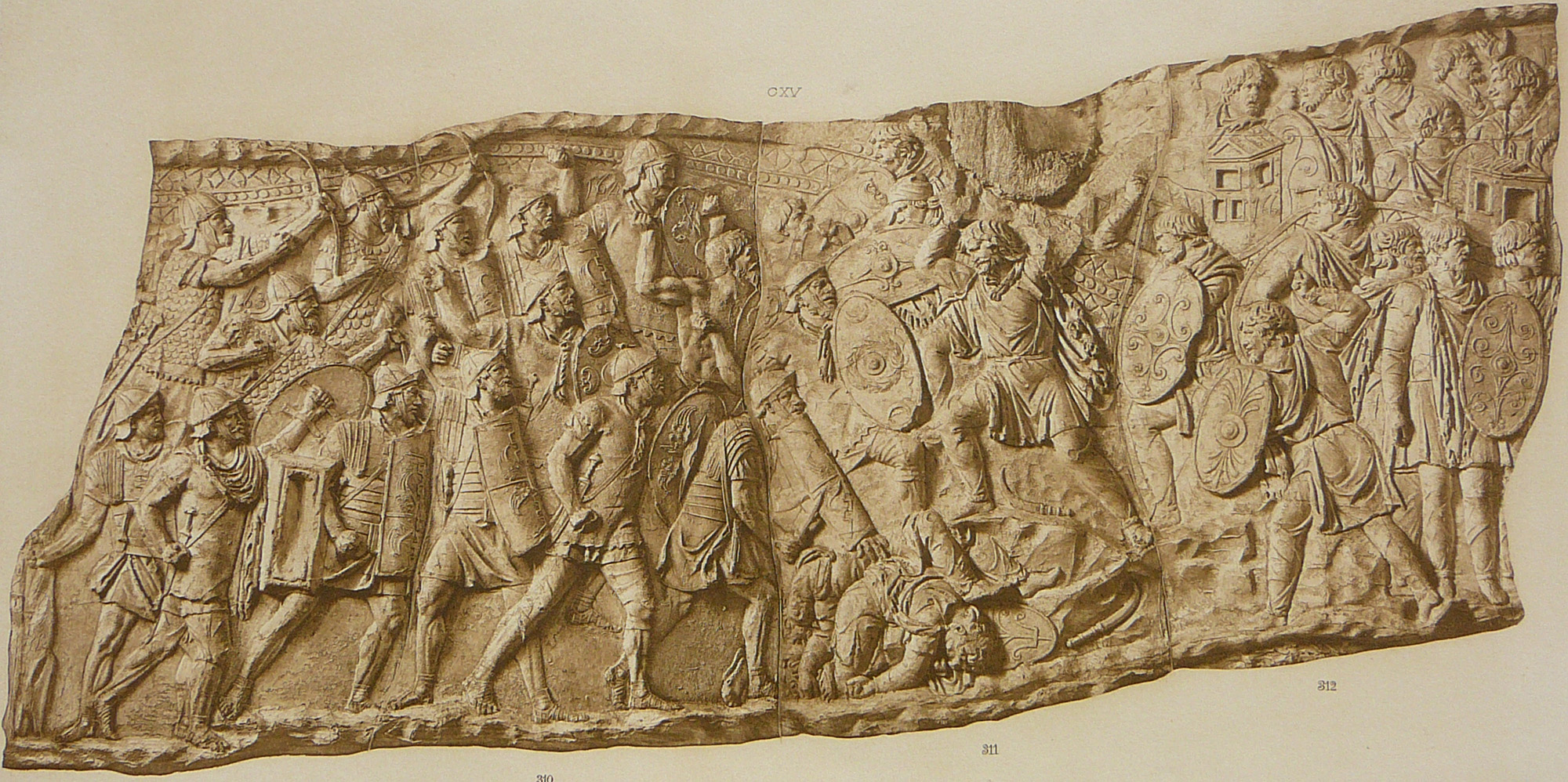
Roman archers (top left) in action. Note conical helmets, indicating Syrian unit, and recurved bows. Trajan's Column, Rome

In the Republican period, the standard trio of specialised auxilia were Balearic slingers, Cretan archers and Numidian light cavalry. These functions, plus some new ones, continued in the 2nd-century auxilia.

==== Heavily-armoured lancers ====
Equites cataphractarii, or simply cataphractarii for short, were the heavily armoured cavalry of the Roman army. Based on Sarmatian and Parthian models, they were also known as contarii and clibanarii, although it is unclear whether these terms were interchangeable or whether they denoted variations in equipment or role. Together with new units of light mounted archers, the cataphractarii were designed to counter Parthian (and, in Pannonia, Sarmatian) battle tactics. Parthian armies consisted largely of cavalry. Their standard tactic was to use light mounted archers to weaken and break up the Roman infantry line, and then to rout it with a charge by the cataphractarii concentrated on the weakest point. The only special heavy cavalry units to appear in the 2nd-century record are ala I Ulpia contariorum and ala I Gallorum et Pannoniorum cataphractaria stationed in Pannonia and Moesia Inferior, respectively, in the 2nd century.

==== Light cavalry ====
From the Second Punic War until the 3rd century AD, the bulk of Rome's light cavalry (apart from mounted archers from Syria) was provided by the inhabitants of the provinces of Africa and Mauretania Caesariensis, the Numidae or Mauri (from whom derives the English term Moors), who were the ancestors of the Berber people of modern Algeria and Morocco. They were known as the equites Maurorum or Numidarum ('Moorish or Numidian cavalry'). On Trajan's Column, Mauri horsemen, depicted with long hair in dreadlocks, are shown riding their small but resilient horses bare-back and unbridled, with a simple braided rope round their mount's neck for control. They wear no body or head armour, carrying only a small, round leather shield. Their weaponry cannot be discerned due to stone erosion, but is known from Livy to have consisted of several short javelins. Exceptionally fast and maneuverable, Numidian cavalry would harass the enemy by hit-and-run attacks, riding up and loosing volleys of javelins, then scattering faster than any opposing cavalry could pursue. They were superbly suited to scouting, harassment, ambush and pursuit. It is unclear what proportion of the Numidian cavalry were regular auxilia units as opposed to irregular foederati units.

In the 3rd century, new formations of light cavalry appear, apparently recruited from the Danubian provinces: the equites Dalmatae ('Dalmatian cavalry'). Little is known about these, but they were prominent in the 4th century, with several units listed in the Notitia Dignitatum.

==== Camel troops ====
A unit of dromedarii ('camel-mounted troops') is attested from the 2nd century, the ala I Ulpia dromedariorum milliaria in Syria.

==== Archers ====
A substantial number of auxiliary regiments (32, or about 1 in 12 in the 2nd century) were denoted sagittariorum, or archer-units (from [[sagittarii|sagittarii]] lit. 'arrow-men', from sagitta 'arrow'). These 32 units (of which four were double-strength) had a total official strength of 17,600 men. All three types of auxiliary regiment (ala, cohors and cohors equitata) could be denoted sagittariorum. Although these units evidently specialised in archery, it is uncertain from the available evidence whether all sagittariorum personnel were archers, or simply a higher proportion than in ordinary units. At the same time, ordinary regiments probably also possessed some archers, otherwise their capacity for independent operations would have been unduly constrained. Bas reliefs appear to show personnel in ordinary units employing bows.

From about 218 BC onwards, the archers of the Roman army of the mid-Republic were virtually all mercenaries from the island of Crete, which boasted a long specialist tradition. During the late Republic (88–30 BC) and the Augustan period, Crete was gradually eclipsed by men from other, much more populous, regions subjugated by the Romans with strong archery traditions. These included Thrace, Anatolia and, above all, Syria. Of the 32 sagittarii units attested in the mid-2nd century, thirteen have Syrian names, seven Thracian, five from Anatolia, one from Crete and the remaining six of other or uncertain origin.

Three distinct types of archers are shown on Trajan's Column: (a) with scalar cuirass, conical steel helmet and cloak; (b) without armour, with cloth conical cap and long tunic; or (c) equipped in the same way as general auxiliary foot-soldiers (apart from carrying bows instead of javelins). The first type were probably Syrian or Anatolian units; the third type probably Thracian. The standard bow used by Roman auxilia was the recurved composite bow, a sophisticated, compact and powerful weapon.

==== Slingers ====
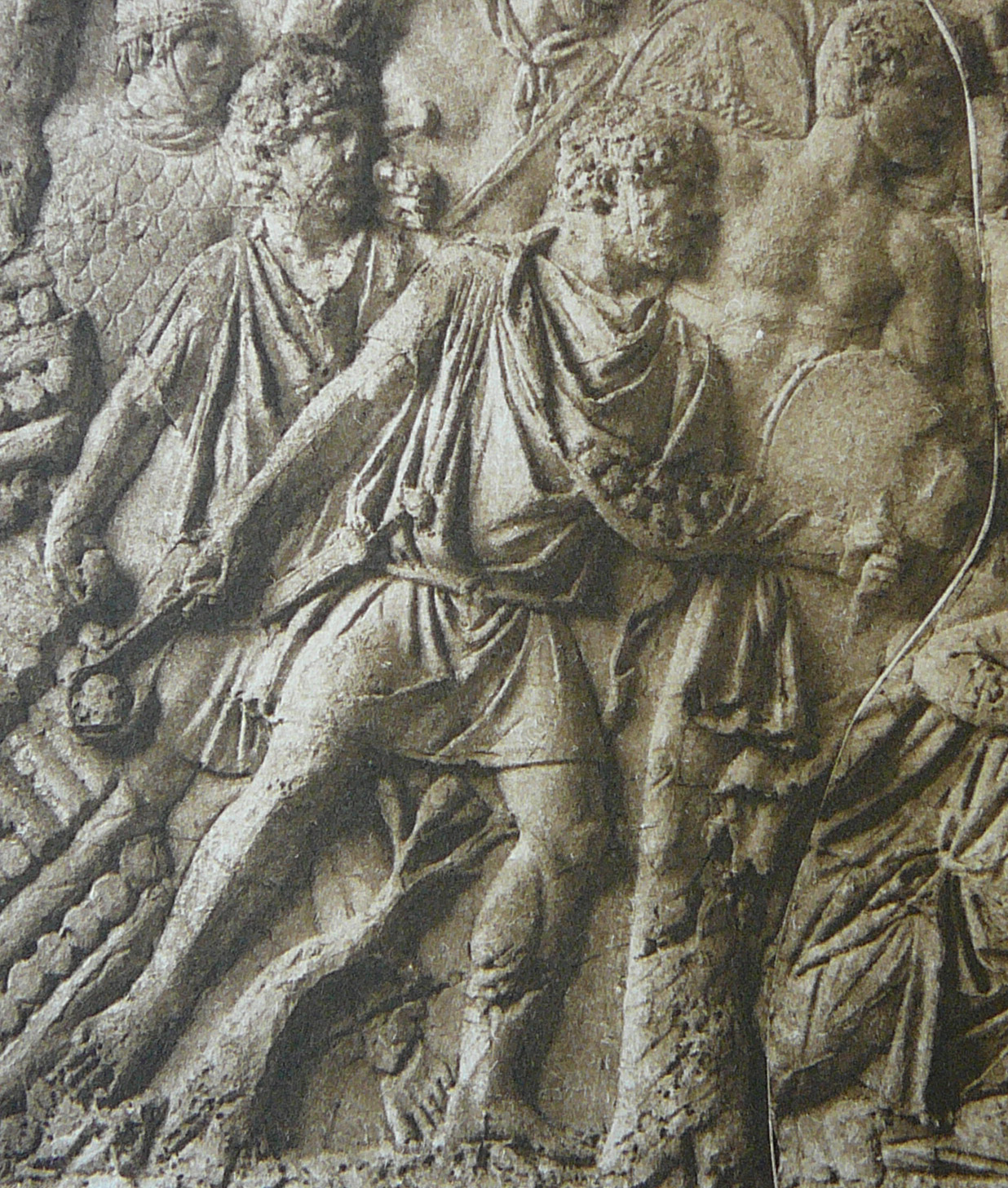
Slingers (funditores) in action in the Dacian Wars. Detail from Trajan's Column, Rome

From about 218 BC onwards, the Republican army's slingers were exclusively mercenaries from the Balearic Islands, which had nurtured a strong indigenous tradition of slinging from prehistoric times. As a result, in classical Latin, Baleares (literally 'inhabitants of the Balearic Islands') became an alternative word for 'slingers' (funditores, from funda 'sling'). Because of this, it is uncertain whether most of the imperial army's slingers continued to be drawn from the Balearics themselves, or, like archers, derived mainly from other regions.

Independent slinger units are not attested in the epigraphic record of the Principate. However, slingers are portrayed on Trajan's Column. They are shown unarmoured, wearing a short tunic. They carry a cloth bag, slung in front, to hold their shot (glandes).

==== Scouts/numeri ====
Exploratores ('reconnaissance troops', from explorare 'to scout'). Two examples include numeri exploratorum attested to in the 3rd century in Britain: Habitanco and Bremenio (both names of forts). It is possible, however, that more than 20 such units served in Britain. The literal translation of numeri is 'numbers' and it was often used in the context of a generic title for any unit that was not of a standard size or structure. From the 2nd century onward they served as frontier guards, often supplied by the Sarmatians and the Germans. Little else is known about such units.

== Irregular allied forces ==
Throughout the Principate period, there is evidence of ethnic units of barbari outside the normal auxilia organisation fighting alongside Roman troops. To an extent, these units were simply a continuation of the old client-king levies of the late Republic: ad hoc bodies of troops supplied by Rome's puppet petty-kings on the imperial borders for particular campaigns. Some clearly remained in Roman service beyond the campaigns, keeping their own native leadership, attire and equipment and structure. These units were known to the Romans as socii ('allies'), symmachiarii (from symmachoi, Greek for 'allies') or foederati ('treaty troops' from foedus, 'treaty'). One estimate puts the number of foederati in the time of Trajan at about 11,000, divided into about 40 numeri (units) of about 300 men each. The purpose of employing foederati units was to use their specialist fighting skills. Many of these would have been troops of Numidian cavalry (see light cavalry above).

The foederati make their first official appearance on Trajan's Column, where they are portrayed in a standardised manner, with long hair and beards, barefoot, stripped to the waist, wearing long trousers held up by wide belts and wielding clubs. In reality, several different tribes supported the Romans in the Dacian wars. Their attire and weapons would have varied widely. The Column stereotypes them with the appearance of a single tribe, probably the most outlandish-looking, to differentiate them clearly from the regular auxilia. Judging by the frequency of their appearance in the Column's battle scenes, the foederati were important contributors to the Roman operations in Dacia. Another example of foederati are the 5,500 captured Sarmatian cavalrymen sent by Emperor Marcus Aurelius (r. 161–180) to garrison a fort on Hadrian's Wall after their defeat in the Marcomannic Wars.

== Recruitment, ranks and pay ==
The evidence for auxiliary ranks and pay is scant: even less exists than the patchy evidence for their legionary counterparts. There seems to be some consensus, however, that the auxiliary was paid one third of what a legionary received: 300 sesterces a year (400 after the reign of the emperor Commodus). Both auxiliaries and seamen received the viaticum of 300 sesterces, although the various sources differ as to whether auxiliaries and sailors received the retirement bonus known as the honesta missio, or honorable discharge.

The available data may be broken down and summarised as follows:

Auxilia ranks and pay (mid-1st century)
Pay scale (as multiple of basic)	Cohors infantry rank (in ascending order)	Amount (denarii)	XXX	Ala rank (in ascending order)	Amount (denarii)
1 (caligati 'rankers')	pedes (infantryman)	188		gregalis (ala cavalryman)	263
1.5 (sesquiplicarii 'one-and-half-pay men')	tesserarius (corporal)	282		sesquiplicarius (corporal)	395
2 (duplicarii 'double-pay men')	signifer (centuria standard-bearer) optio (centurion's deputy) vexillarius (cohort standard-bearer)	376		signifer (turma standard-bearer) curator? (decurion's deputy) vexillarius (ala standard-bearer)	526
Over 5	centurio (centurion = centuria commander) centurio princeps (chief centurion) beneficiarius? (deputy cohort commander)	940 +		decurio (decurion = turma commander) decurio princeps (chief decurion) beneficiarius? (deputy ala commander)	1,315 +
50	praefectus or tribunus (cohort commander)	9,400		praefectus or tribunus (ala commander)	13,150

=== Rankers (caligati) ===
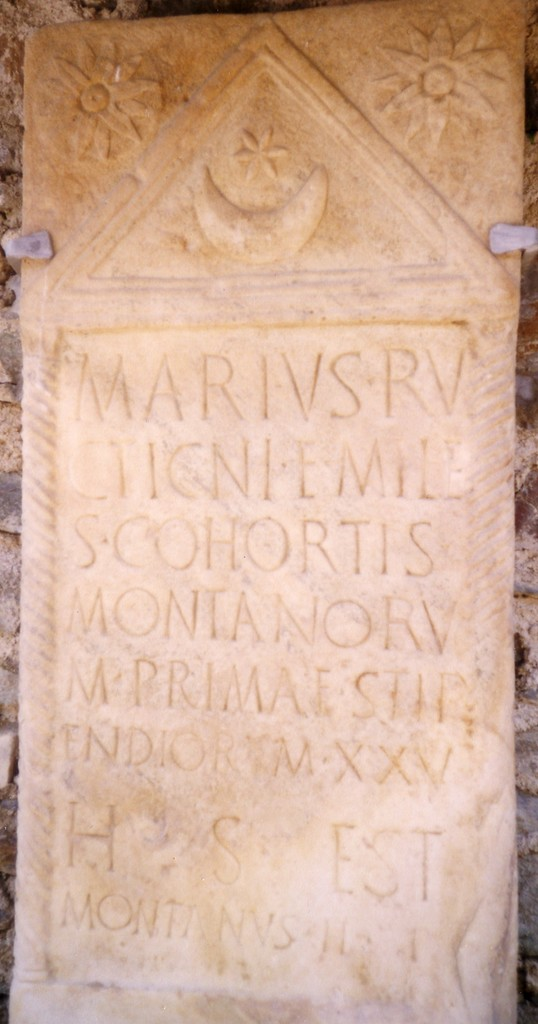
Tombstone of Marius son of Ructicnus. The inscription states that he was a miles (ranker) of the Alpine infantry regiment Cohors I Montanorum, who died in his 25th year of service (i.e. in the final year of the minimum term for an auxiliary and just before qualifying for Roman citizenship). His heir, who erected the stone, is named Montanus, the same ethnic name as the regiment's, meaning a native of the eastern Alps, most likely the origin of the deceased. Note (top corners) the Alpine edelweiss flowers, called stella Alpina 'Alpine star' in Latin. These were either a regimental symbol, or a national symbol of the Montani. The crescent moon-and-star motif between the flowers may be either a regimental emblem or a religious symbol. Date: 1st century, probably ante 68. From Carinthia, Austria

At the bottom end of the rank pyramid, rankers were known as caligati (lit. 'sandal men' from the caligae or hob-nailed sandals worn by soldiers). Depending on the type of regiment they belonged to, they held the official ranks of pedes (foot soldier in a cohors), eques (cavalryman in a cohors equitata) and gregalis (ala cavalryman).

During the Principate, recruitment into the legions was restricted to Roman citizens only. This rule, which derived from the pre-Social War Republican army, was strictly enforced. The few exceptions recorded, such as during emergencies and for the illegitimate sons of legionaries, do not warrant the suggestion that the rule was routinely ignored.

In the 1st century, the vast majority of auxiliary common soldiers were recruited from the Roman peregrini (second-class citizens). In the Julio-Claudian era, conscription of peregrini seems to have been practiced alongside voluntary recruitment, probably in the form of a fixed proportion of men reaching military age in each tribe being drafted. From the Flavian era onwards, the auxilia were an all-volunteer force. Although recruits as young as 14 are recorded, the majority of recruits (66%) were from the 18–23 age group.

When it was first raised, an auxiliary regiment would have been recruited from the native tribe or people whose name it bore. In the early Julio-Claudian period, it seems that efforts were made to preserve the ethnic integrity of units, even when the regiment was posted in a faraway province. But in the later part of the period, recruitment in the region where the regiment was posted increased and became predominant from the Flavian era onwards. The regiment would thus lose its original ethnic identity. The unit's name would thus become a mere curiosity devoid of meaning, although some of its members might inherit foreign names from their veteran ancestors. This view has to be qualified, however, as evidence from military diplomas and other inscriptions shows that some units continued to recruit in their original home areas e.g. Batavi units stationed in Britain, where some units had an international membership. It also appears that the Danubian provinces (Raetia, Pannonia, Moesia, Dacia) remained key recruiting grounds for units stationed all over the empire.

Researchers have often assumed that Roman citizens were also regularly recruited to the auxilia because various sources record auxiliary soldiers with the Tria nomina. Explanations for that phenomenon include that sons of auxiliary veterans preferred to join their fathers' old regiments, which were a kind of extended family to them, rather than join a much larger, unfamiliar legion. However, it has been shown that many of the auxiliary soldiers with tria nomina were not full Roman citizens that could enter a legion, but only had Latin citizenship or belonged (as sons of freedmen) to the "Latini Iuniani". There are, however, also instances of legionaries transferring to the auxilia (to a higher rank). After the grant of citizenship to all peregrini in 212, auxiliary regiments became predominantly citizen units.

Less clearcut is the question of whether the regular auxilia recruited barbari (barbarians, as the Romans called people living outside the empire's borders). Although there is little evidence of it before the 3rd century, the consensus is that auxilia recruited barbarians throughout their history. In the 3rd century, a few auxilia units of clearly barbarian origin start to appear in the record e.g. Ala I Sarmatarum, cuneus Frisiorum and numerus Hnaufridi in Britain.

There existed a hierarchy of pay between types of auxiliary, with cavalry higher paid than infantry. One recent estimate is that in the time of Augustus, the annual pay structure was: eques alaris (gregalis) 263 denarii, eques cohortalis 225, and cohors infantryman 188. The same differentials (of about 20% between grades) seem to have existed at the time of Domitian (r. 81–96). However, Goldsworthy points out that the common assumption that rates of pay were universal across provinces and units is unproven. Pay may have varied according to the origin of the unit.

The remuneration of an auxiliary pedes cohortalis may be compared to a legionary's as follows:

Remuneration of Roman common foot soldiers (about AD 70)
Remuneration item	legionary pedes: amount (denarii) (annualised)	XXX	auxiliary pedes amount (denarii) (annualised)
Stipendium (gross salary)	225		188
Less: Food deduction	60		60
Less: Equipment etc. deductions	50		50
Net disposable pay	115		78
Plus: Donativa (bonuses) (average: 75 denarii every 3 years)	25		none proven
Total disposable income	140		78
Praemia (discharge bonus: 3,000 denarii)	120		none proven

Gross salary was subject to deductions for food, clothing, boots and hay (probably for the company mules). It is unclear whether the cost of armour and weapons was also deducted, or borne by the army. Deductions left the soldier with a net salary of 78 denarii. This sum was sufficient, on the basis of the food deduction, to amply feed an adult for a year. In 84 AD Domitian increased basic legionary pay by 33% (from 225 to 300 denarii): a similar increase was presumably accorded to auxiliaries, boosting their net income to 140 denarii, i.e. more than two food allowances. It was entirely disposable, as the soldier was exempt from the poll tax (capitatio), did not pay rent (he was housed in fort barracks) and his food, clothing and equipment were already deducted. It should be borne in mind that most recruits came from peasant families living at subsistence level. To such persons, any disposable income would appear attractive. It could be spent on leisure activities, sent to relatives or simply saved for retirement.

There is no evidence that auxiliaries received the substantial cash bonuses (donativum) handed to legionaries on the accession of a new emperor and other occasions. Although irregular, these payments (each worth 75 denarii to a common legionary) averaged once every 7.5 years in the early 1st century and every three years later. Duncan-Jones has suggested that donativa may have been paid to auxiliaries also from the time of Hadrian onwards, on the grounds that the total amount of donative to the military increased sharply at that time. A very valuable benefit paid to legionaries was the discharge bonus (praemia) paid on completion of the full 25 years' service. At 3,000 denarii, this was equivalent to ten years' gross salary for a common legionary after the pay increase of 84 AD. It would enable him to purchase a substantial plot of land. Again, there is no indication that auxiliaries were paid a discharge bonus. For auxiliaries, the discharge bonus was the grant of Roman citizenship, which carried important tax exemptions. However, Duncan-Jones argues that the fact that service in the auxilia was competitive with the legions (deduced from the many Roman citizens that joined the auxilia) that a discharge bonus may have been paid.

=== Junior officers (principales) ===
Below centurion/decurion rank, junior officers in the Roman army were known as principales. An auxiliary cohort's ranks appear the same as in a legionary centuria. These were, in ascending order: tesserarius ('officer of the watch'), signifer (standard-bearer for the centuria), optio (centurion's deputy) and vexillarius (standard-bearer for the whole regiment, from vexillum). In the turmae of cohortes equitatae (and of alae?), the decurion's second-in-command was probably known as a curator, responsible for horses and caparison. As in the legions, the principales, together with some regimental specialists, were classified in two pay-scales: sesquiplicarii ('one-and-a-half-pay men') and duplicarii ('double-pay men'). These ranks are probably most closely resembled by the modern ranks of corporal and sergeant respectively.

Besides combat effectives, regiments also contained specialists, the most senior of whom were sesquiplicarii or duplicarii, the rest common soldiers with the status of milities immunes ('exempt soldiers' i.e. exempt from normal duties). Ranking specialists included the medicus (regimental doctor), veterinarius (veterinary doctor, in charge of the care of horses, pack animals and livestock), custos armorum (keeper of the armoury), and the cornicularius (clerk in charge of all the regiment's records and paperwork).

=== Senior officers ===
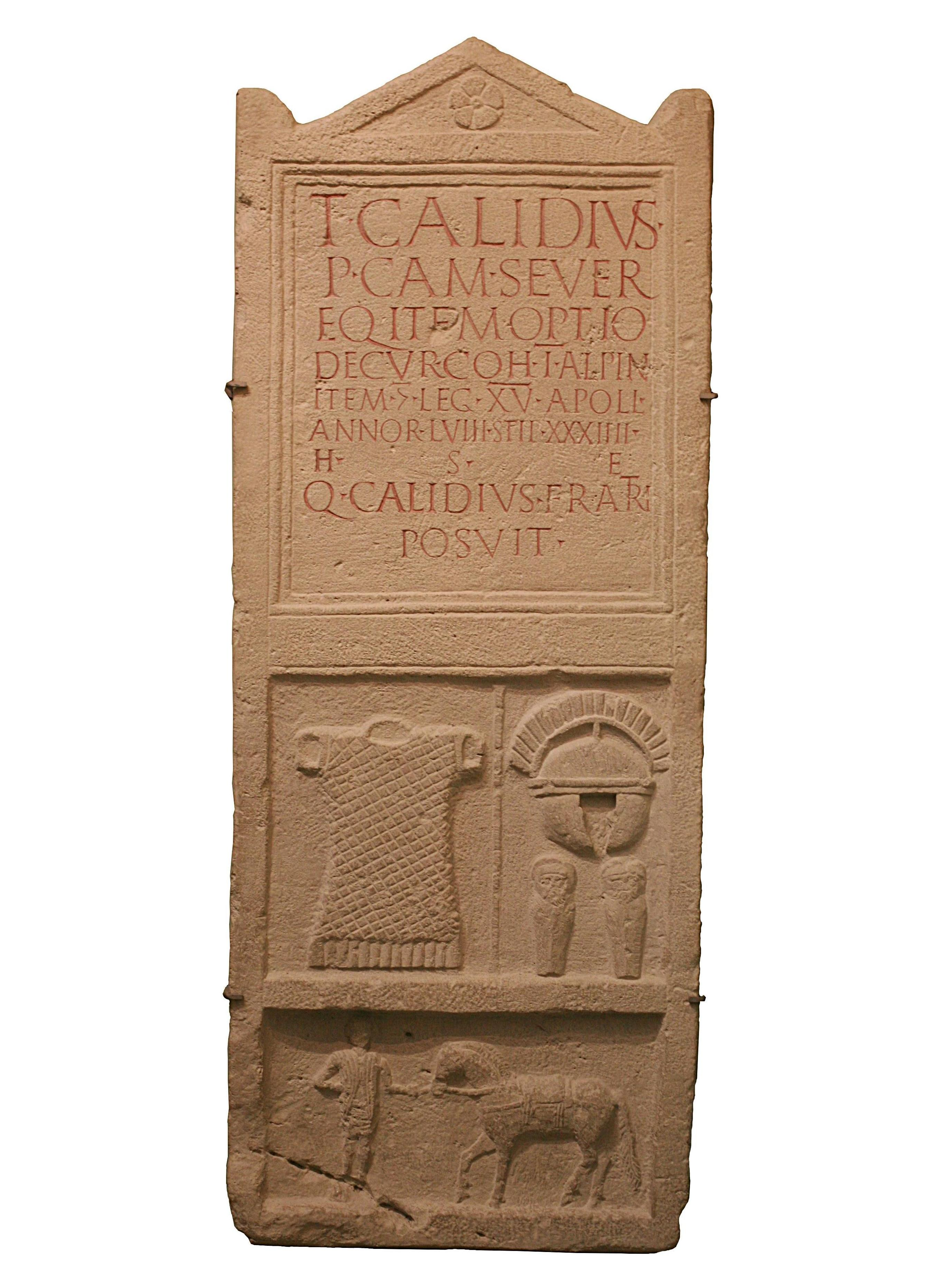
Tombstone of Titus Calidius Severus, a Roman cavalryman. The career summary in the inscription shows that Severus joined the auxiliary regiment cohors I Alpinorum, rising from eques (common cavalryman) through optio to decurion. He then switched to a legion (presumably after gaining Roman citizenship after 25 of his 34 years of service) and became a centurion in Legio XV Apollinaris (it appears that legion cavalrymen used infantry ranks). He died at age 58, probably a few years after his discharge. Note the portrayal of his chain-mail armour, centurion's transverse-crested helmet and his horse, led by his equerry, probably a slave. This soldier's long career shows that many auxiliaries served longer than the minimum 25 years, and sometimes joined legions. Erected by his brother, Quintus. Dates from ante 117, when XV Apollinaris was transferred from Carnuntum (Austria) to the East

The limited evidence on auxiliary centuriones and decuriones is that such officers could be directly commissioned as well as promoted from the ranks. Many appear to have come from provincial aristocracies. Those rising from the ranks could be promotions from the legions as well as from the regiment's own ranks. In the Julio-Claudian period auxiliary centuriones and decuriones were a roughly equal split between citizens and peregrini, though later citizens became predominant due to the spread of citizenship among military families. Because centuriones and decuriones often rose from the ranks, they have often been compared to warrant officers such as sergeants major in modern armies. However, centurions' social role was much wider than a modern warrant officer. In addition to their military duties, centurions performed a wide range of administrative tasks, which was necessary in the absence of an adequate bureaucracy to support provincial governors. They were also relatively wealthy, due to their high salaries (see table above). However, most of the surviving evidence concerns legionary centurions and it is uncertain whether their auxiliary counterparts shared their high status and non-military role.

There is little evidence about the pay-scales of auxiliary centuriones and decuriones, but these are also believed to have amounted to several times that of a miles.

Unlike a legatus legionis (who had an officer staff of six tribuni militum and one praefectus castrorum), an auxiliary praefectus does not appear to have enjoyed the support of purely staff officers. The possible exception is an attested beneficiarius ('deputy'), who may have been the praefectus' second-in-command, if this title was a regular rank and not simply an ad hoc appointment for a specific task. Also attached to the praefectus were the regiment's vexillarius (standard-bearer for the whole unit) and cornucen (horn-blower).

=== Commanders ===
From a survey by Devijver of persons whose origin can be determined, it appears that during the 1st century, the large majority (65%) of auxiliary prefects were of Italian origin. The Italian proportion dropped steadily, to 38% in the 2nd century, and 21% in the 3rd century. From the time of emperor Claudius (r. 41–54) only Roman knights were eligible to hold command of an auxiliary regiment. This status could be obtained either by birth (i.e. if the person was the son of a hereditary Roman knight; or by attaining the property qualification (100,000 denarii, the equivalent of 400 years' gross salary for an auxiliary alaris); or by military promotion: the latter were the chief centurions of legions (centurio primus pilus) who would normally be elevated to equestrian rank by the emperor after completing their single-year term as primuspilus.

Equestrians by birth would normally begin their military careers at c. 30 years of age. An axillary had to do 25 years of service before joining the army. Commands were held in a set sequence, each held for 3–4 years: prefect of an auxiliary cohors, tribunus militum in a legion and finally prefect of an auxiliary ala. In Hadrian's time, a fourth command was added, for exceptionally able officers, of prefect of an ala milliaria. Like officers senatorial rank, hereditary equestrians held civilian posts before and after their decade of military service, whereas non-hereditary officers tended to remain in the army, commanding various units in various provinces. By the 3rd century, most auxiliary prefects had exclusively military careers.

The pay of a praefectus of an auxiliary regiment in the early 2nd century has been estimated at over 50 times that of a miles (common soldier). (This compares to a full colonel in the British Army, who is currently paid about five times a private's salary). The reason for the huge gap between the top and the bottom of the pyramid is that Roman society was far more hierarchical than a modern one. A praefectus was not just a senior officer. He was also a Roman citizen (which most of his men were not) and, as a member of the equestrian order, an aristocrat. The social gulf between the praefectus and a peregrinus soldier was thus immense, and the pay differential reflected that fact.

== Names, titles and decorations ==
=== Regimental names ===
The nomenclature of the great majority of regiments followed a standard configuration: unit type, followed by serial number, followed by name of the peregrini tribe (or nation) from whom the regiment was originally raised, in the genitive plural case e.g. cohors III Batavorum ('3rd Cohort of Batavi'); cohors I Brittonum ('1st Cohort of Britons'). Some regiments combine the names of two peregrini tribes, most likely after the merger of two previously separate regiments e.g. ala I Pannoniorum et Gallorum ('1st Wing of Pannonii and Gauls'). A minority of regiments are named after an individual, mostly after the first prefect of the regiment, e.g. ala Sulpicia (presumably named after a prefect whose middle (gens) name was Sulpicius). The latter is also an example of a regiment that did not have a serial number.

=== Titles ===
Regiments were often rewarded for meritorious service by the grant of an honorific title. The most sought-after was the prestigious c.R. (civium Romanorum 'of Roman citizens') title. In the latter case, all the regiment's members at the time, but not their successors, would be granted Roman citizenship. But the regiment would retain the c.R. title in perpetuity. Another common title was the gens name of the emperor making the award (or founding the regiment) e.g. Ulpia: the gens name of Trajan (Marcus Ulpius Traianus r.98–117). Other titles were similar to those given to the legions e.g. pia fidelis (p.f. 'dutiful and loyal').

=== Decorations ===
The Roman army awarded a variety of individual decorations (dona) for valour to its legionaries. Hasta pura was a miniature spear; phalerae were large medal-like bronze or silver discs worn on the cuirass; armillae were bracelets worn on the wrist; and torques were worn round the neck, or on the cuirass. The highest awards were the coronae ('crowns'), of which the most prestigious was the corona civica, a crown made of oak leaves awarded for saving the life of a Roman citizen in battle. The most valuable award was the corona muralis, a crown made of gold awarded to the first man to scale an enemy rampart. This was awarded rarely, as such a man hardly ever survived.

There is no evidence that auxiliary common soldiers received individual decorations, although auxiliary officers did. Instead, the whole regiment was honoured by a title reflecting the type of award e.g. torquata (awarded a torque) or armillata (awarded bracelets). Some regiments would, in the course of time, accumulate a long list of titles and decorations e.g. cohors I Brittonum Ulpia torquata pia fidelis c.R..

== Deployment in the 2nd century ==
Imperial auxilia: Summary of known deployments c. 130 AD
Province	Approx. modern equivalent	Alae (no. mill.)	Cohortes (no. mill.)	Total aux. units	Auxiliary infantry	Auxiliary cavalry*	Total auxilia
Britannia	England/Wales	11 (1)	45 (6)	56	25,520	10,688	36,208
Rhine Frontier
Germania Inferior	S Neth/NW Rhineland	6	17	23	8,160	4,512	12,672
Germania Superior	Pfalz/Alsace	3	22 (1)	25	10,880	3,336	14,216
Danube Frontier
Raetia/Noricum	S Ger/Switz/Austria	7 (1)	20 (5)	27	11,220	5,280	16,500
Pannonia (Inf + Sup)	W Hungary/Slovenia/Croatia	11 (2)	21 (4)	32	11,360	8,304	19,664
Moesia Superior	Serbia	2	10	12	4,800	1,864	6,664
Moesia Inferior	N Bulgaria/coastal Rom	5	12	17	5,760	3,520	9,280
Dacia (Inf/Sup/Poroliss)	Romania	11 (1)	32 (8)	43	17,920	7,328	25,248
Eastern Frontier
Cappadocia	Central/East Turkey	4	15 (2)	19	7,840	3,368	11,208
Syria (inc Judaea/Arabia)	Syria/Leb/Palest/Jordan/Israel	12 (1)	43 (3)	55	21,600	10,240	31,840
North Africa
Aegyptus	Egypt	4	11	15	5,280	3,008	8,288
Mauretania (inc Africa)	Tunisia/Algeria/Morocco	10 (1)	30 (1)	40	14,720	7,796	22,516
Internal provinces		2	15	17	7,200	2,224	9,424
Total Empire		88 (7)	293 (30)	381	152,260	71,468	223,728

Roman Empire during Hadrian's reign (AD 125)

Notes: (1) Table excludes about 2,000 officers (centurions and above). (2) Auxiliary cavalry nos. assumes 70% of cohortes were equitatae

Analysis

1. The table shows the importance of auxiliary troops in the 2nd century, when they outnumbered legionaries by 1.5 to 1.
2. The table shows that legions did not have a standard complement of auxiliary regiments and that there was no fixed ratio of auxiliary regiments to legions in each province. The ratio varied from six regiments per legion in Cappadocia to 40 per legion in Mauretania.
3. Overall, cavalry represented about 20% (including the small contingents of legionary cavalry) of the total army effectives. But there were variations: in Mauretania the cavalry proportion was 28%.
4. The figures show the massive deployments in Britannia and Dacia. Together, these two provinces account for 27% of the total auxilia corps.

== See also ==
- Imperial Roman army
- Roman auxiliaries in Britain
- Structural history of the Roman military
- Veteran (Roman history)
