= Third Legion =

The Third Legion can refer any of these Roman Legions:

- Legio III Augusta
- Legio III Cyrenaica
- Legio III Diocletiana
- Legio III Gallica
- Legio III Isaura
- Legio III Italica
- Legio III Parthica

It can also refer to the Third Legion (Syria) of the Syrian National Army.

== See also ==
- 3rd Legion Tercio "Don Juan de Austria" regiment of the Spanish Legion
- 3rd Legion First Encirclement Campaign against Jiangxi Soviet
- 3rd Legion of the Vistula (Poles) Battle of Alcañiz
