= Comitatenses =

Central army of the late Roman Empire

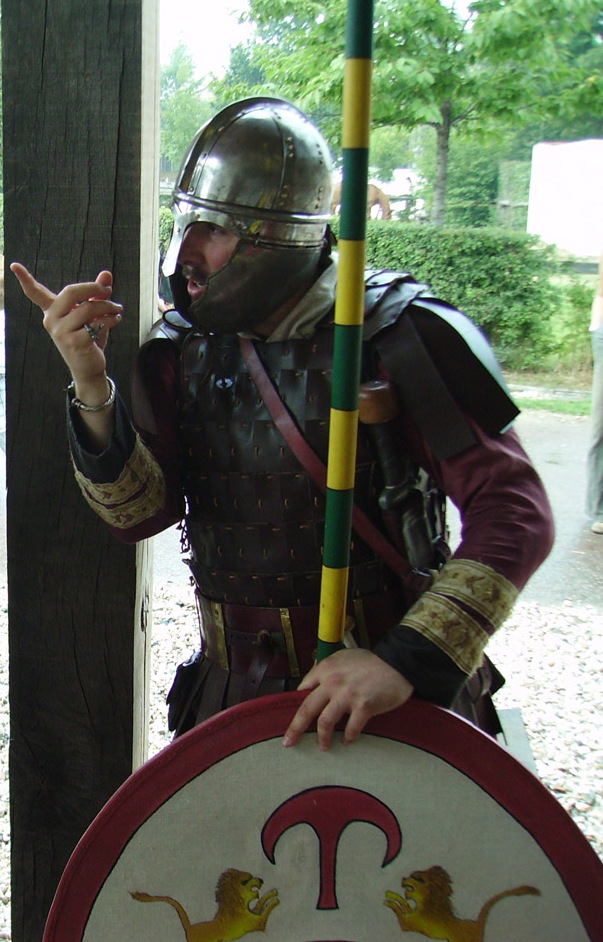
A re-enactor portraying a Roman infantry soldier of the Late Antiquity

The comitatenses and later the palatini were the units of the field armies of the late Roman Empire. They were the soldiers that replaced the legionaries, who had formed the backbone of the Roman military since the late republic.

== Organization ==
Units such as the Joviani and Herculiani had 5,000 soldiers and 726–800 cavalrymen. Many units' sizes would vary. There were three types of units, the heavy infantry, medium infantry, and light infantry. The comitatenses were the heavy infantry. The auxiliaries, auxilia palatina, and the peltasts were the medium infantry, and the psiloi were the light infantry. Comitatenses regiments consisted of 1,024 soldiers. Comitatenses legions could consist of 6,000 to 7,000 soldiers. Some of these soldiers would be lightly armed, while others would be heavily armed. During a battle the army would divide into 3-4 divisions. The army might use a double phalanx to protect its rear. Reserves would be located behind or between each division.

== Command structure ==
- Comes
- Primicerius (Commander of the first cohort)
- Ducenarius (Commander of 200 soldiers)
- Centenarius (Commander of 100 soldiers)
- Centenarius Protector
- Centenarius Ordinarius
- Centenarius Ordinatus
- Biarchus (former Optio)
- Semisallis

== Tactics and usage ==
In the Late Roman Empire the army was divided into two major units, the limitanei border guards and mobile armies consisting of comitatenses. The limitanei would deal with smaller raids, or, in the case of larger invasions, try to defend or stall long enough for the comitatenses legions to arrive. These comitatenses would be grouped into field armies. This strategy has been described as "defense in depth." To conserve manpower, the general would do his best to avoid a pitched battle. Rather than attack the enemy, the legions would form a shield wall and wait for the enemy to attack the Romans. The Romans would use their superior coordination to defeat the enemy. The Emperor would command a comitatenses field army to put down rebellions.

== Terminology ==
Comitatenses is the Latin nominative plural of comitatensis, an adjective derived from comitatus ('company, party, suite'; in this military context it came to the novel meaning of 'the field army'), itself derived from comes ('companion', but hence specific historical meanings, military and civilian).

However, historically it became the accepted (substantiated) name for those Roman imperial troops (legions and auxiliary) which were not merely garrisoned at a limes (fortified border, on the Rhine and Danube in Europe and near Persia and the desert tribes elsewhere)—the limitanei or ripenses, i.e. "along the shores"—but more mobile line troops; furthermore there were second line troops, named pseudocomitatenses, former limitanei attached to the comitatus; palatini, elite ("palace") units typically assigned to the magister militum; and the scholae palatinae of actual palace guards, usually under the magister officiorum, a senior court official of the Late Empire.

== List of comitatenses units ==
Among the comitatenses units listed by Notitia Dignitatum are:

=== Under the Western magister peditum ===
1. Undecimani (originally formed from the Legio XI Claudia pia fidelis, Moesia);
2. Secundani Italiciani (originally formed from the Legio II Italica, Africa);
3. Tertiani Italica (originally formed from the Legio III Italica, Illyricum);
4. Tertia Herculea, Illyricum;
5. Secunda Britannica, Gallias;
6. Tertia Iulia Alpina, Italia;
7. Prima Flavia Pacis, Africa;
8. Secunda Flavia Virtutis, Africa;
9. Tertia Flavia Salutis, Africa;
10. Secunda Flavia Constantiniana, Africa Tingitania;
11. Tertioaugustani (Legio III Augusta);

=== Under the Magister Militum per Orientem ===
1. Quinta Macedonica (Legio V Macedonica);
2. Septima gemina (Legio VII Gemina);
3. Decima gemina (Legio X Gemina);
4. Prima Flavia Constantia;
5. Secunda Flavia Virtuti, Africa;
6. Secunda Felix Valentis Thebaeorum;
7. Prima Flavia Theodosiana;

=== Under the Magister Militum per Thracias ===
1. Prima Maximiana Thebaeorum;
2. Tertia Diocletiana Thebaeorum;
3. Tertiodecimani (Legio XIII Gemina?);
4. Quartodecimani (Legio XIV Gemina Martia Victrix?);
5. Prima Flavia gemina;
6. Secunda Flavia gemina.
