= Alares =

Roman kind of militia or soldiery

Alares, in antiquity, are supposed by some authors to have been a kind of militia or soldiery among the Romans, so called from ala, a wing, because of their lightness and swiftness in combat.

Others make them a people of Pannonia. Yet others, with more probability, take alares for an adjective or epithet, and apply it to the Roman cavalry, because they were placed in the two wings, or alæ of the army.
