= Equites Dalmatae =

Late Roman army cavalry class

The equites Dalmatae (Latin for "Dalmatian horsemen") were a class of cavalry in the Late Roman army. They were one of several categories of cavalry unit or vexillatio created between the 260s and 290s as part of a poorly understood reorganization and expansion of Roman cavalry forces. These new cavalry vexillationes, typically bearing the basic regimental designation equites, mostly originated as detachments of existing mounted units (alae, cohortes equitatae, equites legionis), which were separated from their parent corps and later constituted as independent units.

The equites Dalmatae were the largest category of the new cavalry vexillationes. At the beginning of the fifth century, the Notitia Dignitatum lists 48 units of equites Dalmatae or cunei Dalmatarum deployed throughout the Roman Empire (31 in the West; 17 in the East). The earliest documentation relates to the reign of Gallienus (r. 260–268 AD). The titular component probably refers to the geographical region in which these units were raised and/or originally stationed, namely the provinces of the western Balkans which formed the core of Gallienus’ truncated empire. They possibly originated as detachments of alae and cohortes equitatae available to Gallienus in these provinces. The equites Dalmatae appear to have contributed to the victories of Claudius II (r. 268–270 AD) over the Goths in 269, and they participated in Aurelian’s reconquest of Palmyra in 272–3. Subsequently, probably under the Tetrarchy or Constantine I, most of the equites Dalmatae were permanently assigned to the garrisons of frontier provinces. That which holds the equites Dalmatae on 875-2 had been requited to that on its Constantine Transformation
