= Biarchus =

Military position in the Late Roman Empire

A Biarchus was a military position in the army of the Late Roman Empire that was created after the military reforms of Diocletian. Although the Code of Justinian mentions the position of Biarchus as part of the Agentes in Rebus, which were the Imperial couriers, other sources mention their presence in a variety of military positions in the Roman military: they appear in the scholae palatina, auxilia palatina, fabricae, vexillationes, and in the stratores. Their duties are unknown, but they may have related to food supply. The biarchus was subordinate to the centenarius and the ducenarius but above the circitor in the command structure of the Roman military. This position may have replaced the role of the Optio.

It is possible that the Biarchus commanded a contubernium, which was a Roman military unit consisting of ten men. Historian Michael Speidel argued that Roman texts on military formations and ancient inscriptions indicate that in the Late Roman military the biarchus was synonymous with the decanus, who commanded the contubernium. Spiedel argues that, since the biarchus is often interpreted as a type of mess-leader, and the author Vegetius refers to the mess-leader as the caput contubernii ("head of a tent group"), the biarchus may have been equivalent to the decanus. Historian Warren Treadgold argued that Biarchus also held the same powers as a decurion.

Speidel also proposed that the rank of Biarchus derived from the rank of exarchus. He argued that soldiers could earn the title of Bis Exarchus, and that this title was shortened to Biarchus. Speidel cited an inscription which rewarded soldiers with the title Bis exarchi. According to Speidel, this theory provides an explanation as for why the title of exarchus is primarily used in the third century, whilst the title of Biarchus is used throughout the fourth and fifth centuries. Speidel states that the Greek etymology of the word exarchus implies the position has eastern roots and potentially originated from new units being created from preexisting horseman and decurions.

The position is mentioned in the text Ad Pannachium by Saint Jerome. Saint Jerome listed officer ranks in the Roman army, including those of the biarchus. In the Codex Theodosianus it is stated that no one is allowed to achieve the rank of Biarchus through patronage. Instead, it mandates that an individual must achieve the rank through merit. The code prohibits more than 250 Biarchi serving on duty. Furthermore, the code mandates that if a Biarchus or anyone of a lower rank dies in battle, then their son is obligated to take their place in the army and earn their pay. One edict issued in the year 534 found in the Code of Justinian directed towards Belisarius outlines the annual payment of eight Biarchi in Africa. It decrees that each of the Biarchi was to be given 14 solidi in payment.

== List of Biarchi ==
Name	Description
Flavius Antoninus	Addressed in one of the letters of Athanasius of Alexandria. He is given the title of Biarchus centenarius.
Flavius Iovianus	Recorded in an inscription as a biarchus draconarius. He was a standard-bearer and a Biarchus. This inscription has been dated to 327, but also to the 380s and 390s.
Flavius Mansuetus	Mentioned in an inscription as a Biarchus in an Auxilia Palatina unit of Leones seniores.
Flavius Martinianus	Mentioned in an inscription as a Biarchus fabricensis.
Flavius Mercurius	Mentioned in an inscription as a Biarchus fabricensis.
Flavius Odiscus	Mentioned in an inscription as a Biarchus in a numerus of Brachiati.
Flavius Paulus	Mentioned in an inscription as the son of another officer named Flavius Iovianus.
Flavius Saume	Mentioned in an inscription as a Biarchus in a numerus of Brachiati.
Flavius Taurinus	Found on varying papyri dated to the 5th century. He is said to be the son of an individual named Plusammon and a Biarchus in Hermopolis. Taurinus achieved the rank of primicerius of a numerus in Hemopolis. He is also recorded to have had a son and grandson who pursued military careers.
Flavius Ursus	Commemorated on an inscription found near modern Óbuda. It was located in the ancient city of Aquincum.
Flavius Vitalianus	Found on an inscription dated to the year 359.
Ursicus	Mentioned in an inscription as a Biarchus who commanded a numerus of Batavian troops.
Valerius Victorinus	Biarchus who died on September 18, 324 in the Battle of Chrysopolis. Inscription was found on a gravestone in Ulmetum, which was part of Moesia.
Valerius Vincentius	Commemorated in an inscription as a "biarc(h)us de nu[m(ero)] iscutarior[um."
Valerius Vivianus	Identified from a funeral stele.
