= Apollonius Paradoxographus =

2nd-century BC Greek writer

Apollonius Paradoxographus was the otherwise unknown author of a paradoxographical work entitled Mirabilia or Historiae Mirabiles. This was compiled from the works of earlier writers around the 2nd century BC.

Nothing is known about Apollonius. His one surviving work, the Mirabilia, is a collection of wonderful phenomena of nature, gathered from the works of Aristotle, Theophrastus, and others. It was formerly published under the name of Apollonius Dyscolus who was known to have written a work called On Fabricated History, but which was probably an exposition of certain errors or forgeries which had crept into history.
