= Paradoxography =

Genre of classical studies

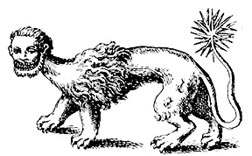
The Manticore, an impossible creature that was treated as real by many in medieval society

Paradoxography is a genre of classical literature which deals with the occurrence of abnormal or inexplicable phenomena of the natural or human worlds (Latin mirabilia, 'marvels, miracles'). The term paradoxographos (paradoxographer) was coined by Tzetzes.

Early surviving examples of the genre include:

- Palaephatus's Περὶ ἀπίστων (ἱστοριῶν) ("On Incredible Things") (c. 4th century BCE)
- The Ἱστοριῶν παραδόξων συναγωγή ("Collection of Extraordinary Tales") composed by Antigonus of Carystus (fl. 3rd century BCE), partly on the basis of a paradoxographical work of Callimachus
- Apollonius Paradoxographus's Mirabilia (2nd century BCE)

It is believed that the content of the pseudo-Aristotelian On Marvellous Things Heard (De mirabilibus auscultationibus) originated in the Hellenistic period, while the final form reflects centuries of expansion at least as recent as the second century of the Christian era.

Phlegon of Tralles's Περὶ θαυμασίων, (De mirabilibus, On Marvels), which dates from the 2nd century CE, is perhaps the most famous example of the genre, including various stories of human abnormalities. Phlegon's brief accounts of prodigies and wonders include ghost stories, accounts of monstrous births, strange animals like centaurs, hermaphrodites, giant skeletons and prophesying heads. Phlegon's writing is characterised by brief and forthright description, as well as a tongue-in-cheek insistence on the veracity of his claims.

Other works of this genre in Greek include Heraclitus the Paradoxographer's Περὶ Ἀπίστων ("On Incredible Things", c. 1st or 2nd century CE) and Claudius Aelianus's On the Nature of Animals (3rd century CE).

In Latin literature, both Marcus Terentius Varro and Cicero wrote works on admiranda ("marvelous things"), which do not survive.

== See also ==
- Bestiary
- Cryptozoology
