= Agentes in rebus =

Late Roman Imperial Courier Service

The agentes in rebus (Ancient Greek: ἀγγελιαφόροι, romanized: angeliaphóroi, lit. 'messengers', or μαγιστριανοί, magistrianoí, 'magister's men') were the late Roman imperial and Byzantine courier service and general agents of the central government from the 4th to the 7th centuries.

== History ==
The exact date of their institution is unknown. They are first mentioned in 319, but may date to Diocletian's reforms in the late 3rd century, when they replaced the earlier and much-detested frumentarii. The central imperial administration still needed couriers, and the agentes in rebus filled this role. Originally they acted as dispatch carriers, but eventually assumed a variety of duties—the title itself translates as "Those Active in Matters". They fell under the jurisdiction of the magister officiorum (Master of the Offices), hence their alternate Greek name of magistrianoi. They were eventually abolished sometime in the early 8th century, as most of the magister's functions were taken over by the logothetēs tou dromou. The last reference to an agens comes in the chronicle of Theophanes the Confessor, where the magistrianos Paul is recorded as having been sent on an embassy in 678.

=== Ostrogothic Kingdom ===
The schola of the agentes in rebus of the Western Empire did not cease to exist when the West fell, but the office underwent a transformation over the following decades. By the time of the Ostrogothic Kingdom, the function of the agentes was now inherited by two new types of officials, comitiaci, who were Romans and saiones, who were Goths. These agents answered directly to the King and existed outside of the traditional power structure within the realm. Evidence suggests responsibilities differed between the two types of agents, though they likely frequently collaborated with one another due to overlapping interests of the two groups of citizens. Comitiaci are known to have been responsible for affairs concerning Romans, such as hauling people to court who did not appear and dealing with corrupt Roman officials, though comitiaci do not appear to have had any military authority nor were they armed like their Gothic counterparts. Saiones, who were a part of the Gothic court, were responsible for affairs concerning the king's own people, the Goths, such as serving as protectors for officials, arresting criminals, recruitment for the army and navy, and overseeing the construction of forts. Civilians could also petition saiones to intervene on their behalf in unspecified situations, for which a saio would charge a fee. Saiones had an array of responsibilities and were incredibly versatile due to their relationship with the king and royal court.

== Organization and function ==
The agentes in rebus were formed into a schola of the palace, and in common with other public services of the Dominate, their service was militarized, and considered a militia. Indeed, the agentes were divided into five ranks, taken from the junior cavalry officers: equites, circitores, biarchi, centenarii and ducenarii. Two were appointed to each province in 357, one in 395 and more again after 412. Each member of the agentes in rebus was normally promoted into other branches of the government. The Code of Justinian notes furthermore that the agentes enjoyed immunity from prosecution both civil and criminal, unless otherwise sanctioned by the Master of Offices. Senior agentes were regularly appointed to the post of princeps officii of the praetorian prefectures, the urban prefectures and the dioeceses, thus exercising control over these departments' bureaucracy and reducing its independence.

As for their function, the 6th-century historian Procopius notes in his Secret History:

The earlier Emperors, in order to gain the most speedy information concerning the movements of the enemy in each territory, seditions or unforeseen accidents in individual towns, and the actions of the governors and other officials in all parts of the Empire, and also in order that those who conveyed the yearly tribute might do so without danger or delay, had established a rapid service of public couriers."

As the service handling communications and communications systems within the Empire, their duties included the supervision of the roads and inns of the cursus publicus (public postal system), the carrying of letters, or verifying that a traveller was carrying the correct warrant (evectio) while using the cursus. Further duties assigned to the agentes included the role of customs officers, the supervision of public works and the billeting of soldiers. They were also used to supervise the arrest of senior officials as required, to escort senior Romans into exile (such as John Chrysostom in 404), and even to assist in the enforcement of government regulation of the church. Ammianus Marcellinus and Procopius also noted their use as ambassadors on several occasions.

Other tasks included supervising the provincial bureaucracy and delivering Imperial commands, often staying in the area to ensure their implementation. Being outside the control of the provincial governors, some agentes, the curiosi (Greek: διατρέχοντες, diatrechontes) were appointed as inspectors and acted as a sort of secret agents, for which they gained a reputation as a secret police force. As their routine assignments brought them into contact with matters of great concern to the court, and as they reported back to the court on everything they saw or heard on their varied missions, the agentes can be seen to have had an intelligence function, in the broadest modern sense of the term. This role, as well as their extraordinary power, made them feared: the 4th-century philosopher Libanius accused them of gross misconduct, terrorizing and extorting the provincials, "sheep-dogs who had joined the wolf pack". Nevertheless, the vast majority operated quite openly, and the claims of the agentes operating as a modern-day secret police are certainly exaggerated.

The numbers of the agentes tended towards inflation, and the corps was viewed with a measure of mistrust by the emperors, who repeatedly tried to regulate its size: 1,174 in the year 430 according to a law of Theodosius II, and 1,248 under Leo I (457–474). Imperial edicts also regulated their promotion, which was to be strictly on seniority, with the annual exception of two officers, whom the emperor could advance at his pleasure.

== In popular culture ==
- Harry Turtledove's alternate history novel, Agent of Byzantium, features a magistrianos as the eponymous protagonist.
- Gillian Bradshaw's historical novel Imperial Purple, set in the 5th century, features one of the agentes and the Master of the Offices as the antagonists.
- In John Conroe's Demon Accords, Agents in Rebus (A.I.R.) was founded at the end of the Revolutionary War by patriots, eventually evolving into a rogue intelligence and black ops subsection of the U.S. government.
- Q. V. Hunter's Embers of Empire series chronicles the career of a fictional agens in the late 4th century.

== See also ==
- Travel in Classical antiquity
