= Legio III Diocletiana =

Roman legion

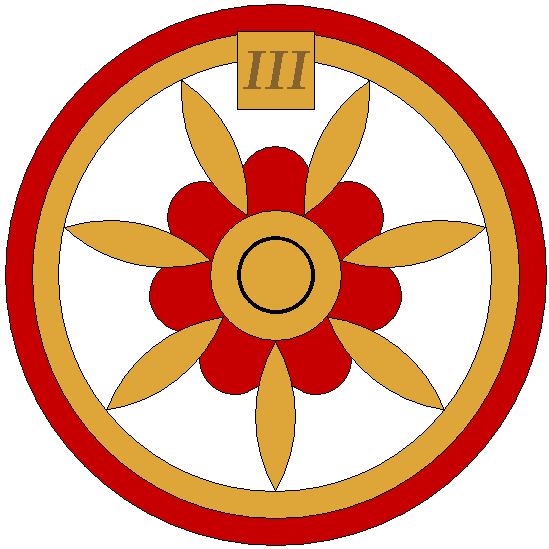
Shieldpattern of Legio Tertia Diocletiana Thebaeorum, early 5th century

Legio III Diocletiana was a comitatensis Roman legion, levied in 296 by Diocletian, from whom the legion took its name. The aim of this unit was to guard the newly re-organized province of Aegyptus, being based in Alexandria. It was created to support II Traiana Fortis, and thus it took the numeral III.

The Papyri Beatty Panopolis contains records of some vexillationes of the III Diocletiana stationed in the south of Egypt, at Thebes and Syene (modern Aswan). These provide information about provisioning, pay (which was often in arrears), and unit sizes.

Theodosius I sent soldiers from the north to III Diocletiana in Egypt, and Egyptian soldiers in Macedonia, forming the III Diocletiana Thebaeorum, under the command of the Magister Militum per Thracias (Notitia Dignitatum Orientis, VIII). The shield pattern of III Diocletiana Thebaeorum was a red rose on white field.

== See also ==
- List of Roman legions
