= Ducenarius =

Wealthy equestrian or high-ranking official in ancient Rome

Ducenarius (pl. ducenarii) was a social and military position in ancient Rome. The term ducenarius means "containing two hundred."

The term was used as far back as the age of Augustus, and it was initially used to refer to wealthy equestrians who possessed at least two hundred thousand sesterces. By the time of the Late Roman Empire it was the name of an equestrian rank, as well as a type of non-commissioned officer in the Roman military. During this period, former ducenarii could still retain the title, and people who never held the office could gain the title. It also became a rank used by the civilian courier service known as the agentes in rebus.

While a ducenarius was originally an officer within the ranks of the domesticus, by the third century CE, the title was used to describe any high-ranking official in the Roman government.
