= Limes (Roman Empire) =

Frontier and border defences of the Roman Empire

Coordinates: 54.9926°N 2.6010°W

Frontiers of the Roman Empire
UNESCO World Heritage Site
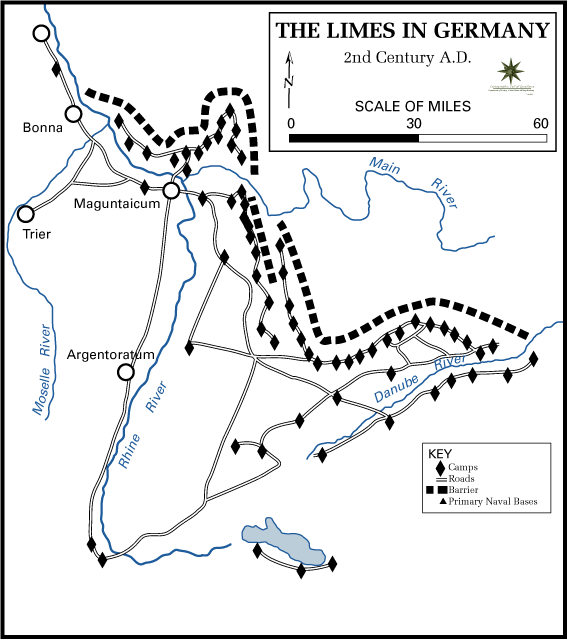
- The limes Germanicus, 2nd century (Note: Mogontiacum is misspelled)
- Interactive map of Frontiers of the Roman Empire
- Criteria: Cultural ii, iii, iv
- Reference: 430
- Inscription: 1987 (11th Session)
- Extensions: 2005, 2008

Limes (Latin; sing., pl.: limites) is a term used primarily for the Germanic border defence or delimiting system of ancient Rome marking the borders of the Roman Empire. The term has been extended in modern times to refer to the frontier defences in other parts of the empire, such as in the east and in Africa.

== Overview ==
Roman Empire in 125 AD near its maximum extent

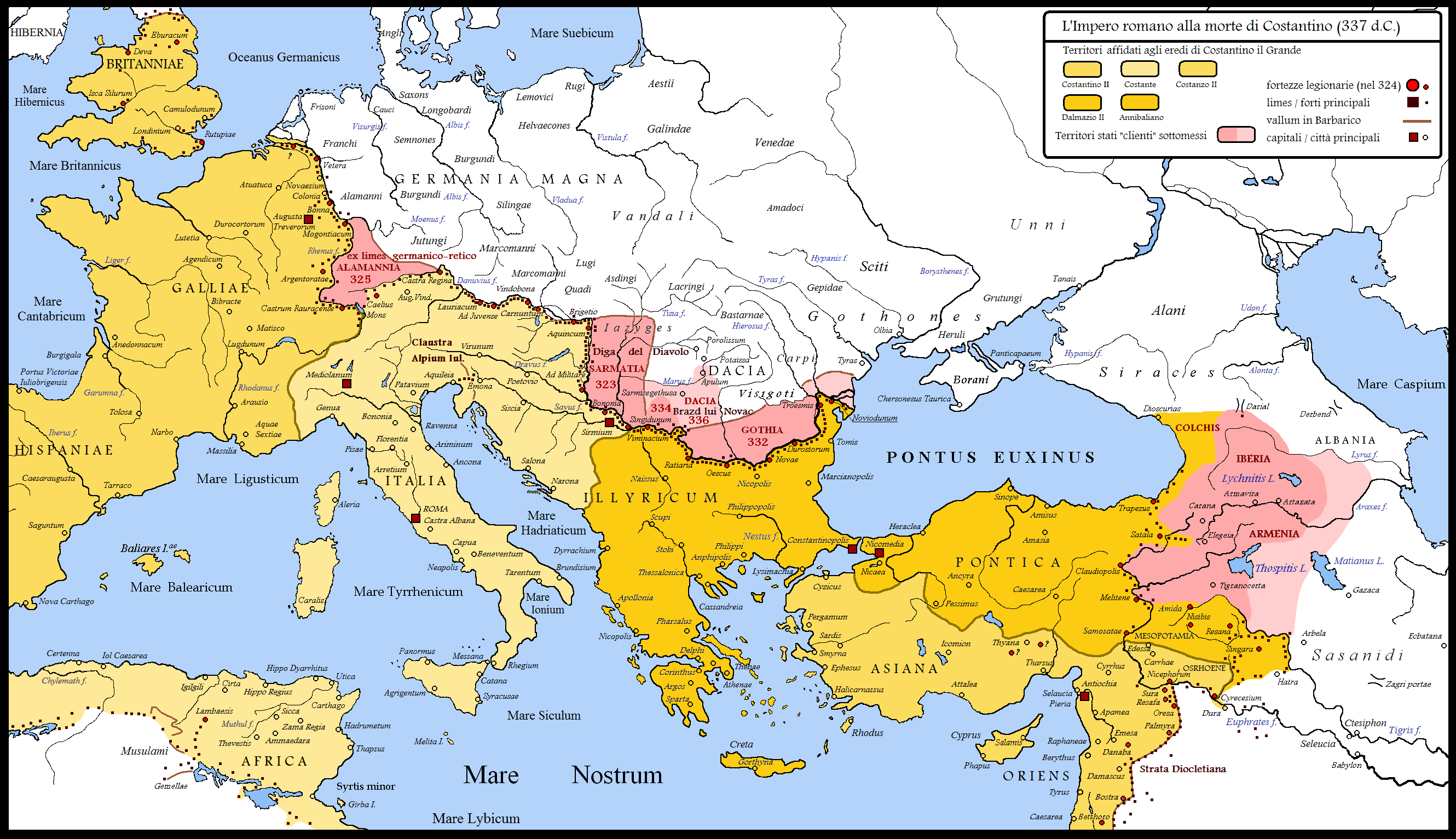
Northern Frontiers in 337 AD showing the reconquests of Constantine the Great

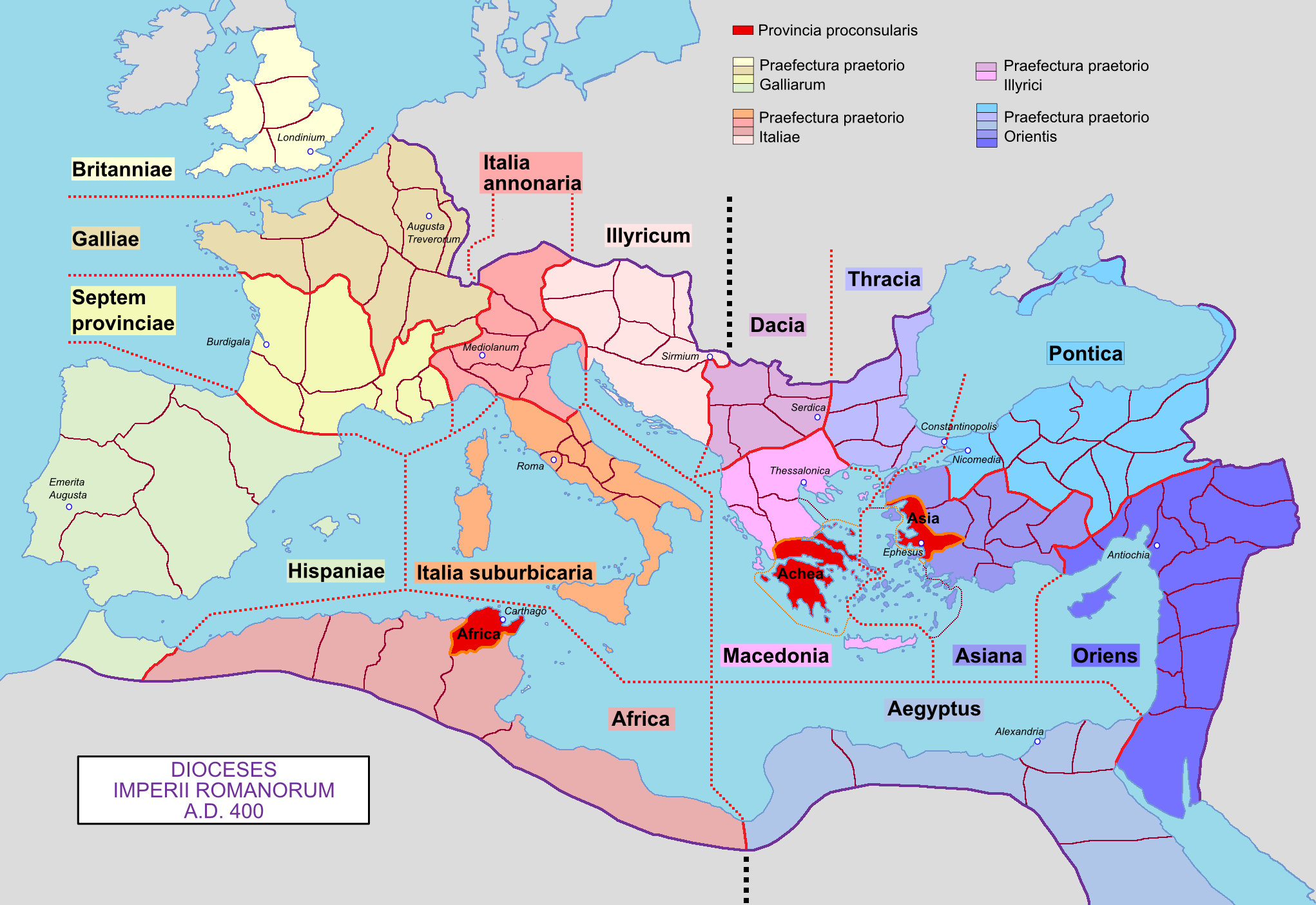
Roman Empire with dioceses in 400 AD

The Roman frontier stretched for more than 10.000 kilometres (6.214 mi) from the Atlantic coast of northern Britain, through Europe to the Black Sea, and from there to the Red Sea and across North Africa to the Atlantic coast. The positions of the borders changed especially during the main periods of Roman expansion and contraction, and first became more stable during the early Empire period under Augustus, but the borders continued to change with time in different provinces. The borders had different constituents depending on local needs; often they consisted of natural boundaries (e.g. rivers) with roads behind for easier movement of troops between linked forts (e.g. Danubian Limes), or else roads with linked forts (e.g. Stanegate, Fosse Way).

The remains of the frontiers today consist of vestiges of roads, forts, fortresses, walls and ditches, and associated civilian settlements. The soldiers at a border were referred to as limitanei. They were not expected to win large-scale wars, but rather to deter small-to-medium-sized raiding parties.

Notable examples of Roman frontiers include:

- Hadrian's Wall in northern England
- Antonine Wall – in Scotland
- Saxon Shore, late Roman coastal forts in South-East England
- Limes Arabicus, the frontier of the Roman province of Arabia Petraea facing the desert
- Limes Tripolitanus, the frontier in modern Libya facing the Sahara
- Fossatum Africae, the southern frontier of the Roman Empire, extending south of the Roman province of Africa in North-Africa.
- Germanic Limes including the:
  - Lower Germanic Limes
  - Upper Germanic-Rhaetian Limes
- Danubian Limes including the:
  - Rhaetian Limes (only those elements along the Danube)
  - Noric Limes, the frontier of the Roman province Noricum, from the River Inn along the Danube to Cannabiaca (Zeiselmauer-Wolfpassing) in Austria.
  - Pannonian Limes, the frontier of the Roman province Pannonia, along the Danube from Klosterneuburg Austria to Taurunum in Serbia.
  - Moesian Limes, the frontier of the Roman province Moesia, from Singidunum Serbia along the Danube to Moldavia.
- Dacian Limes including:
  - Limes Alutanus, the eastern border of the Roman province of Dacia
  - Limes Transalutanus, the later advanced eastern frontier of Dacia
  - Limes Porolissensis, the northernmost line of defence of the province.

== Etymology ==
The stem of limes, limit-, which can be seen in the genitive case, limitis, marks it as the ancestor of an entire group of words in many languages related to Latin; for example, English limit or French limite. The Latin noun līmes (English: /ˈlaɪmiːz/; Latin pl. līmitēs) had a number of different meanings: a path or balk delimiting fields; a boundary line or marker; any road or path; any channel, such as a stream channel; or any distinction or difference. The term was also commonly used after the 3rd century AD to denote a military district under the command of a dux limitis.

An etymology by Julius Pokorny in Indogermanisches Etymologisches Wörterbuch says that limes comes from Indo-European el-, elei-, lei-, "to bow", "to bend", "elbow". According to Pokorny, Latin limen, "threshold", is related to limes, being the stone over which one enters or leaves the house. Some scholars have viewed the frontier as a threshold. The Merriam–Webster dictionaries take this view, as does J. B. Hofmann in Etymologisches Wörterbuch des Griechischen under leimon. The White Latin Dictionary denies any connection, deriving limen from *ligmen, as in lien from *leig-, "tie". In this sense, the threshold ties together the doorway. W. Gebert also wrote an article discussing the term.

The first use of the term limes as meaning "land border" appears for the first time in 98 AD by Tacitus:

...nec iam de limite imperii et ripa, sed de hibernis legionum et de possessione dubitatum (...not only were the frontier of the empire and the banks [of the Danube] in danger but also the winter-quarters of the legions and the provinces).

Its definitive use for the Danubian border seems to date from about 122 in the time of Hadrian:

Per ea tempora et alia frequenter in plurimis locis, in quibus barbari non fluminibus sed limitibus dividuntur, stipitibus magnis in modum muralis saepis funditus iactis atque conexis barbaros separavit (During this period and on many other occasions also, in many regions where the barbarians are held back not by rivers but artificial barriers, [Hadrian] shut them out by tall stakes planted deep in the ground and fastened together in the manner of a palisade).

Some experts suggested that the Germanic limes may have been called Munimentum Traiani (Trajan's Bulwark) by contemporaries, referring to a passage by Ammianus Marcellinus, according to which emperor Julian had reoccupied this fortification in 360 AD.

=== Meaning of limes as a form of barrier ===
The limes was classified according to the way they functioned as a barrier: natural, artificial, or internal.

==== Natural barriers ====
In the first case the barriers, which divided the Roman world from the barbarians or from other foreign states, could be:

of a fluvial type (such as the Rhine, Danube and Euphrates) and called ripa (in the sense of a riverbank);

mountainous (such as the chain of the Carpathians in Dacia or the Atlas in Mauretania);

or desert (such as along the southern frontier of Egypt and the provinces of Arabia and Syria).

==== Internal areas ====
The third case is very particular. It concerns the so-called praetentura, that is, an area within the empire itself (as was the praetentura Italiae et Alpium at the time of the Marcomannic Wars) entrusted to a special military command (in this particular case to Quintus Antistius Adventus), intended to prevent and block possible barbarian invasions.

== Main strategic-territorial sectors of the Roman limes ==
A people [that of the Romans] that evaluates situations before taking action and that, once it has decided, possesses such an efficient Roman army: is it surprising that the frontiers of its empire are marked, in the East by the Euphrates, by the ocean in the West, to the north by the Danube and the Rhine? Without exaggeration, we might say that their conquests are inferior to their conquerors.

— Josephus, The Jewish War, III, 5.7.107

=== In Europe ===
==== Britain ====
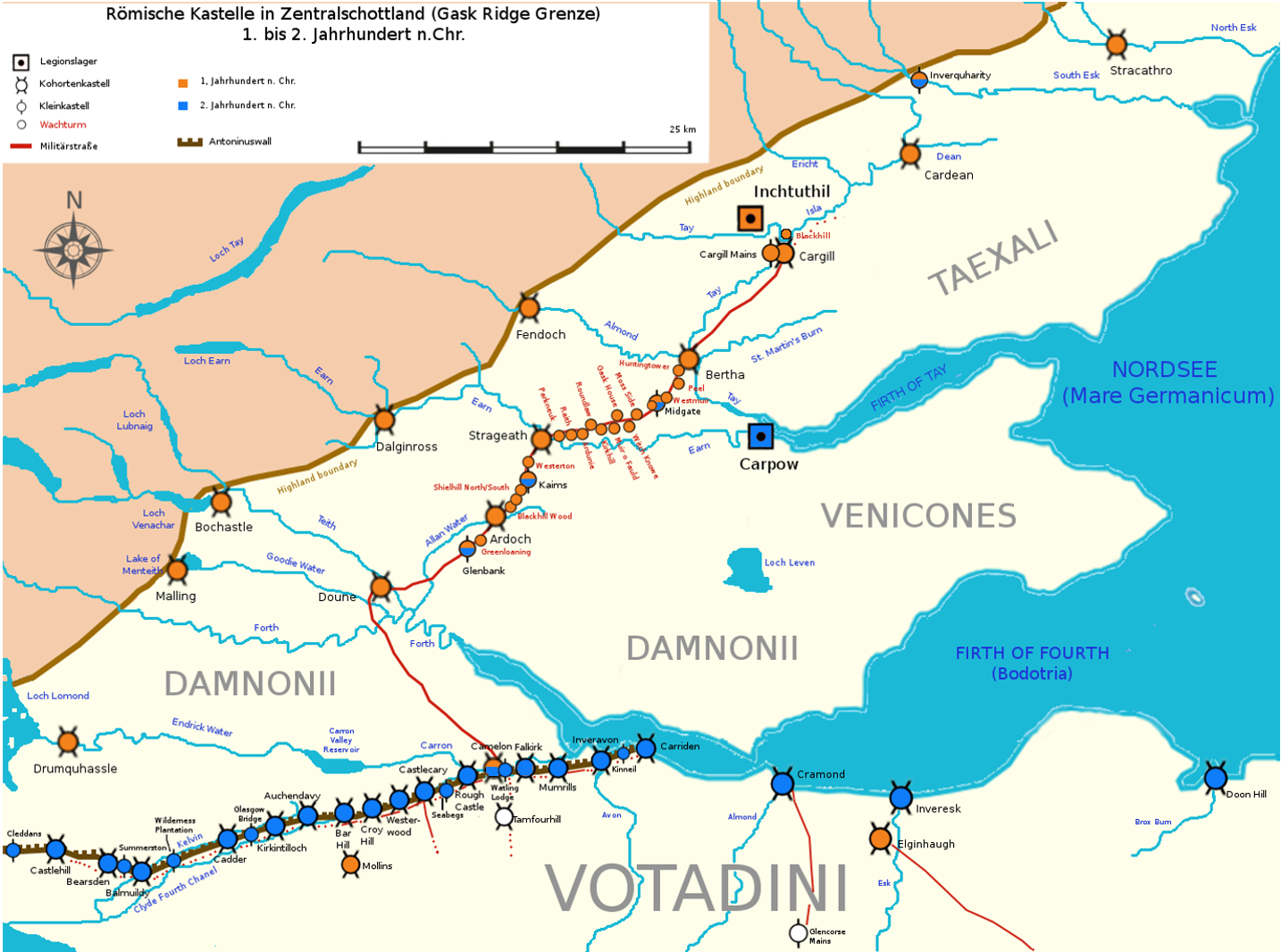
Gask Ridge Limes 85 AD

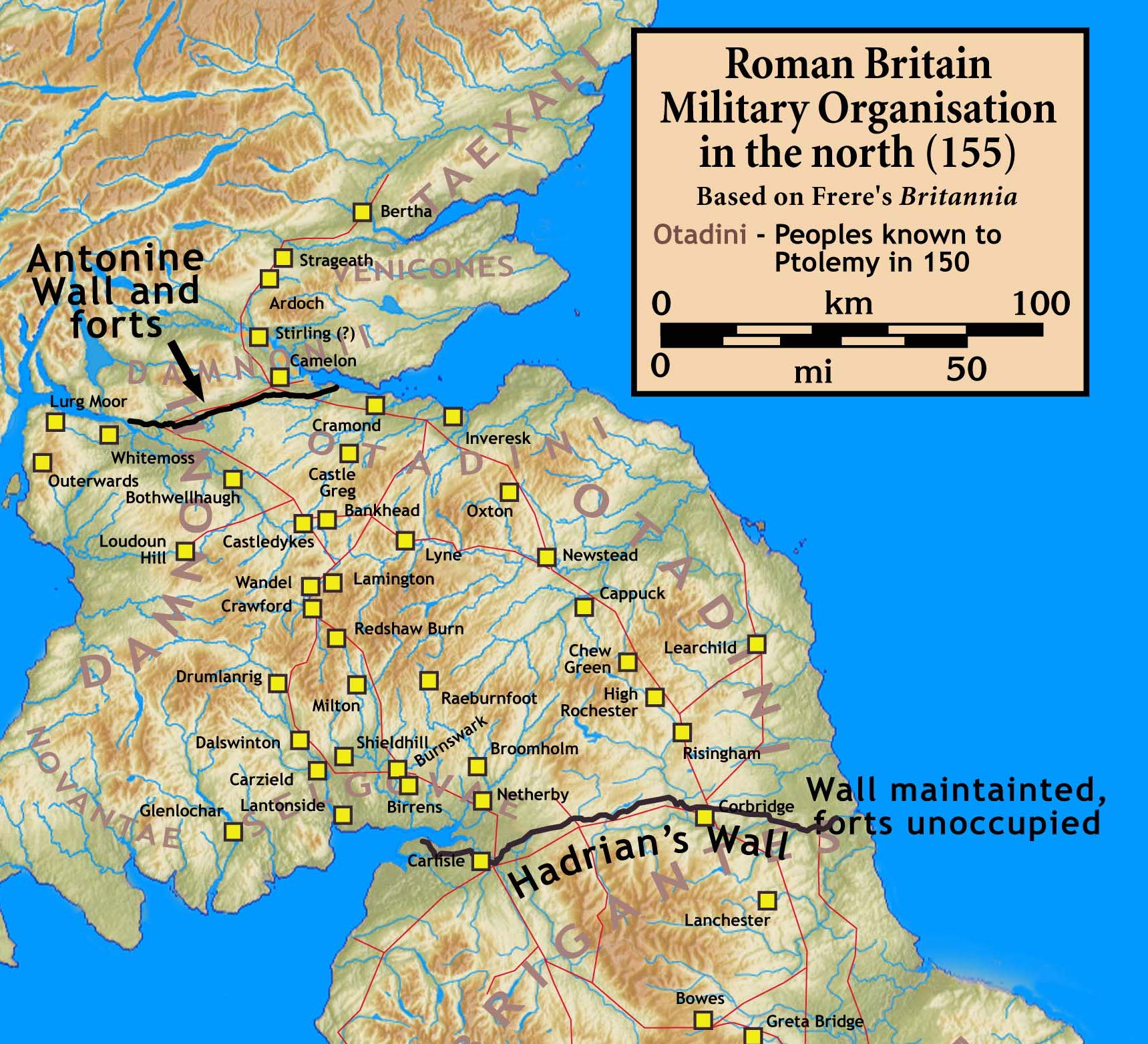
Map of forts and walls in North Britain around 155 AD (most forts on and south of Hadrian's Wall have been omitted)

UNESCO World Heritage sites in Scotland: 1–2 = Antonine Wall, from Old Kilpatrick to Bo'ness
UNESCO World Heritage sites in Northern England: 1–2 = Hadrian's Wall, 3 = Aesica aqueduct, 4 = Corstopitum

The frontier in Britain existed from the 1st to the 5th century AD. Initially the Fosse Way road was a frontier. From the 1st to the 2nd century first the Gask Ridge and then the Stanegate, with their chains of forts and watchtowers, marked the northern boundary of Britannia. Later Hadrian's Wall was built as the frontier and for a short time the Antonine Wall further north. The defence of Hadrian's Wall was achieved through the incorporation of forts and castella. Security and monitoring on the coasts in the west and southeast were achieved by forts and by chains of watchtowers or signal towers, both along the coastline.

The garrisons, Exercitus Britannicus, consisted mostly of cohorts of auxilia. The strategic reserve comprised three legions based in Eburacum (York), Isca Silurum and Deva. The observation and surveillance of the waters around the British Isles was the responsibility of the Classis Britannica, whose headquarters were in Rutupiae (Richborough). Legions, auxilia and the fleet were commanded by the provincial governors. From the 3rd century, units of comitatenses, limitanei and liburnaria (marines) came under the command of two generals:

- Comes Britanniarum
- Dux Britanniarum

==== Saxon Shore ====
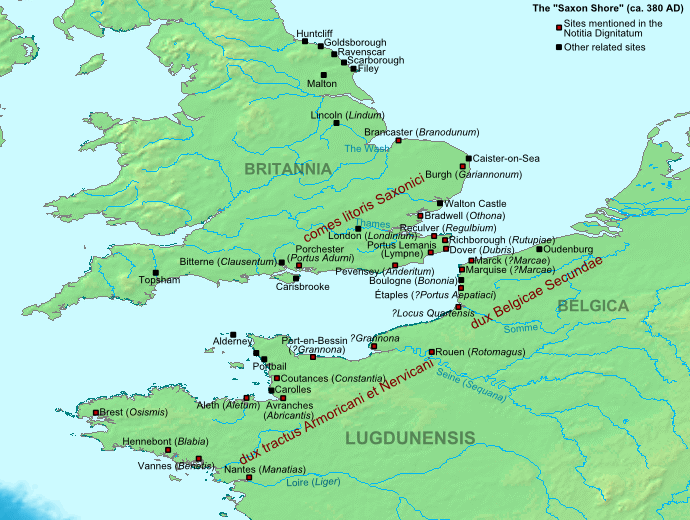
Map of British and Gallic forts on the Saxon Shore

This section of the limes existed from the 3rd to 5th centuries AD and covered the provinces of:

- Britannia Inferior
- Belgica
- Lugdunensis
- Aquitania

This limes of the Late Antiquity ran through the territory of the present-day United Kingdom and France. In the 3rd century, a separate military district, the Litus Saxonicum, was established on the British side of the English Channel between the estuaries of the Wash and the Solent, to repel Saxon pirates and plunderers. The Gallic side of the English Channel and Atlantic coast were included therein. Monitoring and coastal surveillance were carried out by a chain of watchtowers or signal towers, forts and fortified ports (Gaul). Most of the Saxon Shore camps probably served as naval bases.

The garrisons of the forts were composed of infantry and several cavalry regiments. Monitoring and surveillance of the Channel were the responsibility of the Classis Britannica and Classis Sambrica, whose headquarters were in Locus Quartensis (Port d'Etaple), guarding the mouth of the River Somme. The units of comitatenses, limitanei and liburnaria in this area came under the command of three generals:

- Comes litoris Saxonici per Britanniam (Count of the Saxon Shore)
- Dux Belgicae secundae
- Dux tractus Armoricani et Nervicani

==== Lower Germania (Rhenish limes: between the Rhine and the Elbe) ====
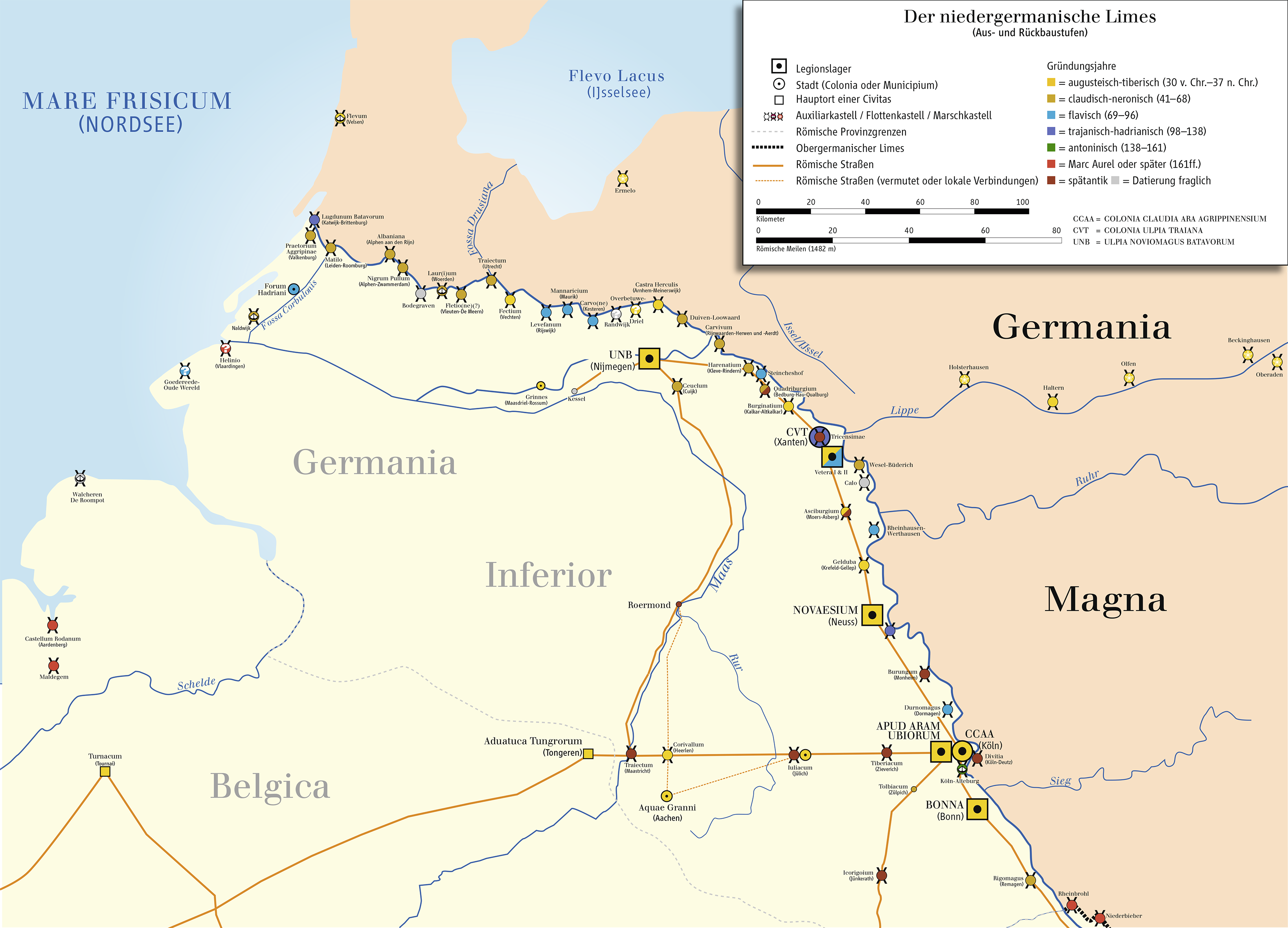
The Roman limes along the lower course of the Rhine from the 1st century to the 5th century. Map of the legion camps and forts in Germania Inferior

This section of limes existed from the 1st to the 5th century AD and ran through the province of Lower Germania (Germania Inferior).

It lies on the territory of today's Netherlands and Germany. This limes was a river border (limes ripa) on the Rhine, defended by a chain of camps, that ran from the North Sea (Katwijk-Brittenburg camp) to Vinxtbach (opposite Rheinbrohl fort on the Upper Germanic Limes), forming the border between the Roman provinces of Germania Inferior and Germania Superior. By contrast with the Upper Germanic-Rhaetian Limes, it was not marked by a solid palisade or wall. Neither can any defensive ditch or rampart be identified. The guards were stationed in nearby castra and watchtowers usually built immediately on the Rhine. The limes was served by a well-developed military road. Each camp had its own river port or landing stage and a storage area, because the Rhine not only formed the border but was also the most important transport and trade route in the region. In the first section, between the camps of Rigomagus (Remagen) and Bonna (Bonn), there were only a few camps. In the second, middle, section between Bonna and Ulpia Noviomagus Batavorum (Nijmegen), there were considerably more. Here there were also larger legion camps; with one exception, all were cavalry barracks. The landscape of the third section between Ulpia Noviomagus Batavorum and Mare Germanicum (the North Sea) was characterised by numerous small streams and boggy marshland. Consequently, in this area there was only one cavalry camp. Border security here consisted mainly of tightly packed, relatively small cohort forts.

The occupying troops, Exercitus Germaniae Inferioris, consisted mostly of auxilia cohorts. From the 2nd century, the strategic reserve comprised three legions stationed in Bonna/Bonn, Novaesium/Neuss, Vetera/Xanten and Noviomagus/Nijmegen. The control and surveillance of the waters of the North Sea, the Rhine estuary and the Lower Rhine was the responsibility of the Classis Germanica whose headquarters was in Colonia Claudia Ara Agrippinensium/Cologne. Legions, auxilia and fleet units were commanded by the respective provincial governor. From the 3rd century the ripenses (river guards), comitatenses, and liburnaria were under the command of the Dux Belgicae secundae.

==== Upper Germania and Rhaetia ====
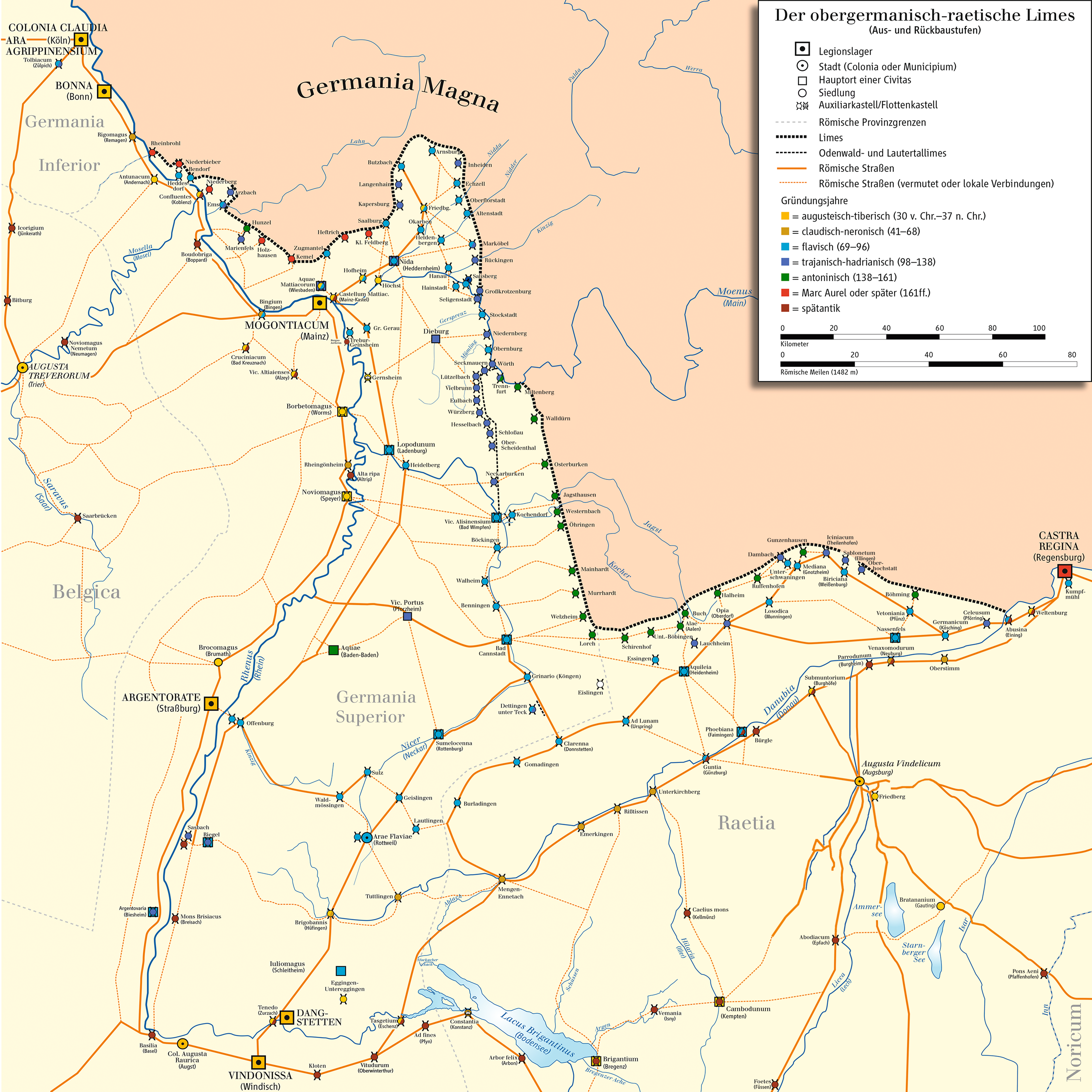
Map of the Upper Germanic-Rhaetian Limes

This limes existed from the 1st to 5th centuries AD and guarded the provinces of:

- Germania Superior
- Rhaetia

It lay on the territory of the present German states of Rhineland-Palatinate, Hesse, Baden-Württemberg and Bavaria. To the north, it bordered those parts of the Roman province of Rhaetia that lay north of the Danube and guarded the eastern border of that part of Germania Superior that lay east of the Rhine. In Upper Germania the border defences initially consisted only of a post road. From about 162/63 AD, the Romans constructed a defensive barrier with watchtowers and signal towers, palisades, ditches and earthworks. On one short section of the Rhaetian Limes, a solid stone wall was erected. In its final stages, the Upper Germanic-Rhaetian Limes was about 550 kilometres long and ran from Rheinbrohl, in the county of Neuwied in northern Rhineland-Palatinate, as far as Hienheim on the Danube. Between the villages of Osterburken and Welzheim, the limes ran for 81 kilometres almost in a straight line southwards.

==== Noricum ====
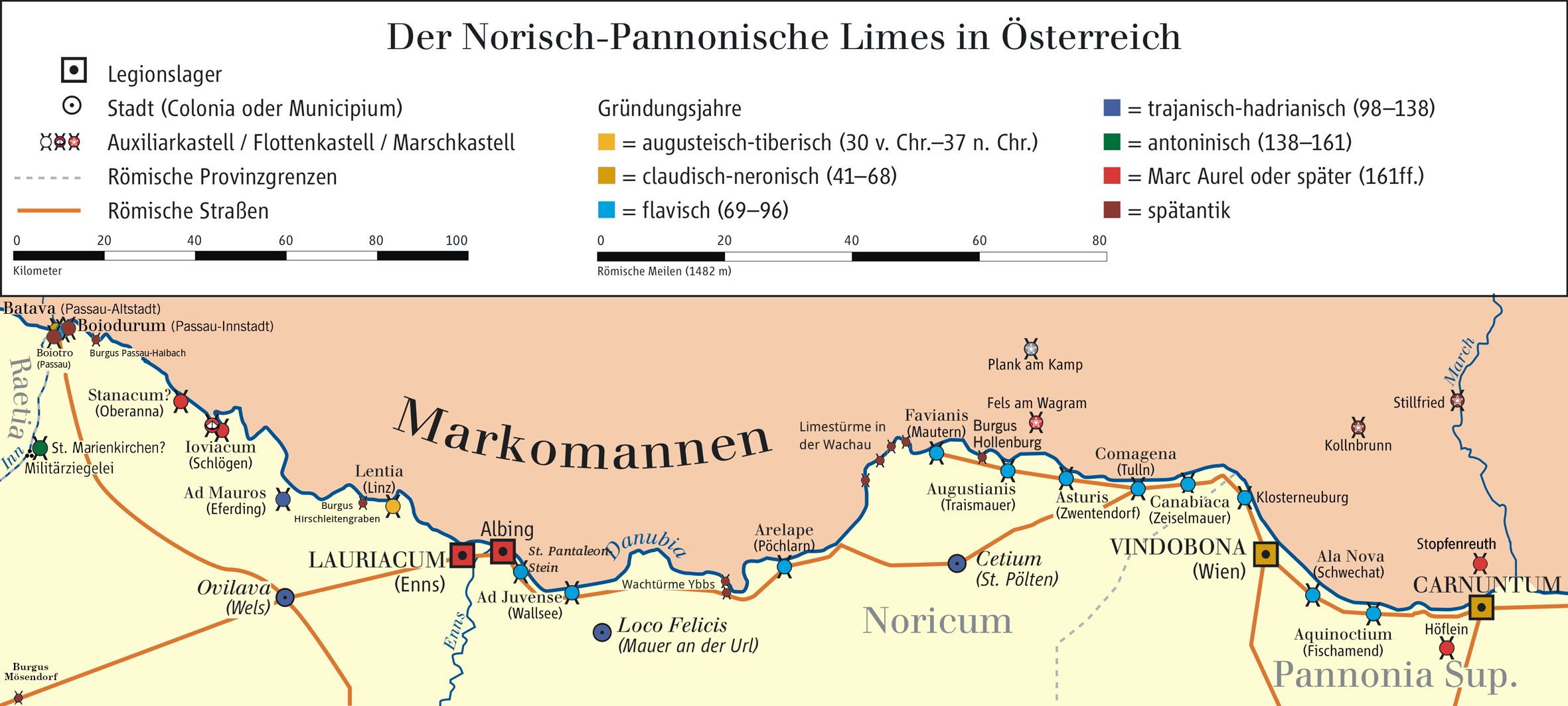
Map of the Norican Limes

This section of the limes existed from the 1st to the 5th century AD and guarded part of the Roman province of Noricum. It is on the soil of the present-day Austrian states of Upper and Lower Austria. It ran along the Danube from Passau/Boiodurum to Zeiselmauer/Cannabiaca. This is also a ripa (river border), which was guarded by a loose chain of cohort forts. The main road on the Norican Limes was the via iuxta amnem Danuvium. The initially simple wood and earth structures were systematically converted under Emperor Hadrian into stone encampments. During the 4th century, they were brought once more up to date and massively reinforced. Between the camps, in strategic places or good points of observation, were watchtowers or signal towers and, in the Late Antiquity, burgi. In the middle section, between the camps of Favianis and Melk, watchtowers were built only sporadically. Here the narrow valley of the Wachau, with its densely forested escarpments, made access to the riverbank more difficult, providing some defensive function. Every camp had its own river port or landing stage and a storage area because the Danube was not only a border zone, but also the most important transport and trade route in the region. Over time civilian settlements or vici were established immediately next to the camps. In the immediate hinterland of the limes, walled towns or municipia were founded – for example, Aelium Cetium or Ovilava (Wels). They were the administrative or commercial centres of the region. In late antiquity, the Norican area was divided into two parts (pars inferior and pars superior).

==== Pannonia ====
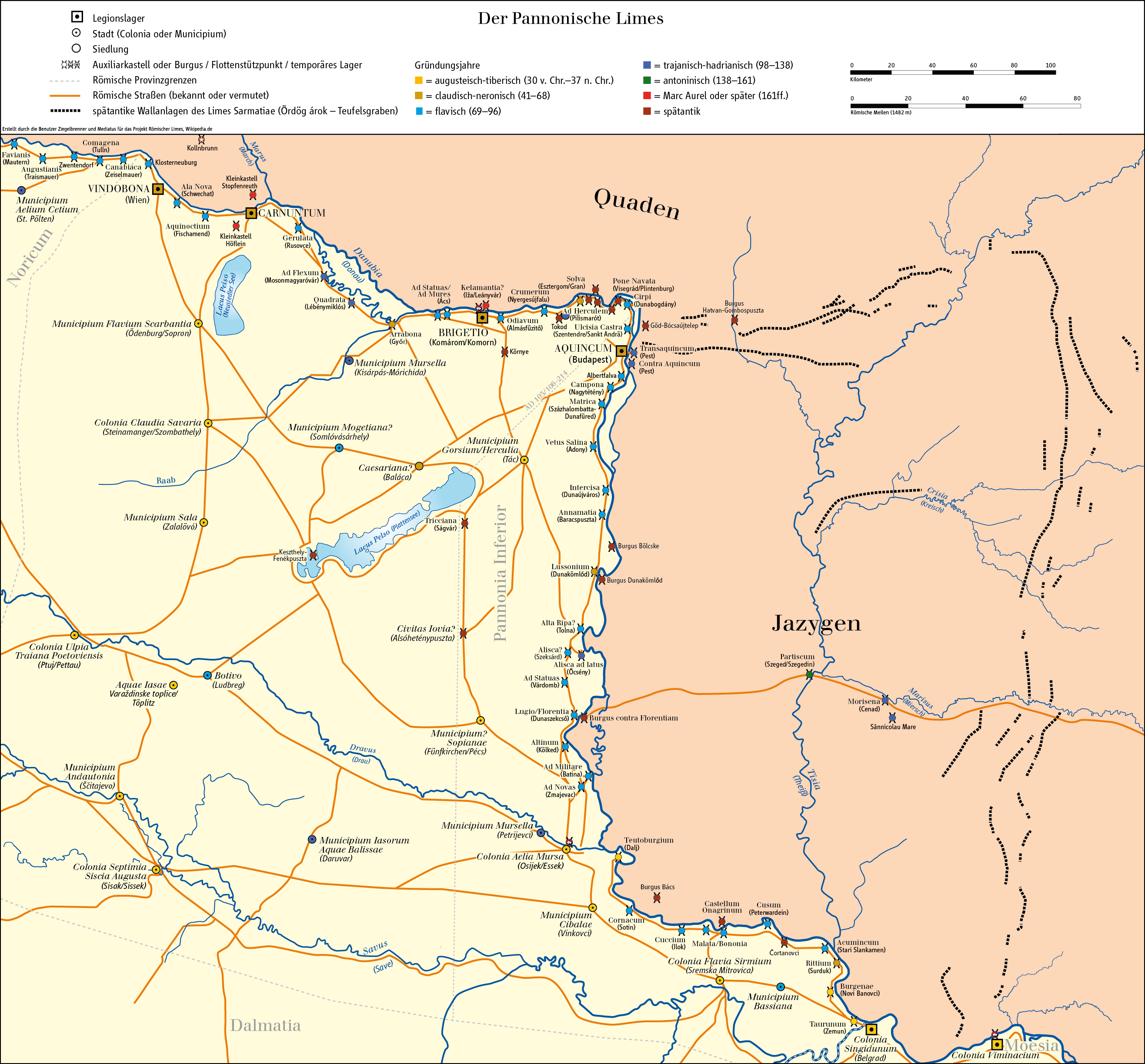
Map of the Pannonian Limes with its perimeter defences

This stretch of limes was in use from the 1st to the 5th centuries AD and helped to guard the provinces of:

- Pannonia inferior
- Pannonia

The Pannonian Limes is situated on the territory of present-day Austria, Slovakia and Hungary. Although this section of the frontier was relatively well protected by the Danube river border or Ripa, the Roman military presence here was always exceptionally strong (three military camps in Pannonia, but only one in Lower Pannonia) because especially after the abandonment of Roman Dacia in the late 3rd century, the pressure of migrant peoples from the east on this section of the limes intensified. The tributaries emptying into the Danube offered cheap transport routes, but also made good approach routes for invaders and raiders. The military camps were therefore built by the most important fords or confluences and road termini. The legion- and auxilia camps were mainly located in the immediate vicinity of the riverbank. The initial wood and earth structures, were systematically converted under Emperor Hadrian into stone barracks and, in the 4th century, redesigned and massively strengthened in order to match new strategic requirements. The gaps between the camps were closed by a chain of watchtowers or signal towers. In late Roman times huge inland camps were built and towns in the hinterland were fortified to create a second line of defence. In addition, at vulnerable points, units of the Danube fleet were stationed. In the time of Emperor Marcus Aurelius the first mention is made in Pannonia of stone watchtowers (burgi, panelled towers and fortlets (praesidia). In late antiquity, the Pannonian military district was divided into two parts (pars inferior and pars superior).

=== Asia and the Eastern frontier ===
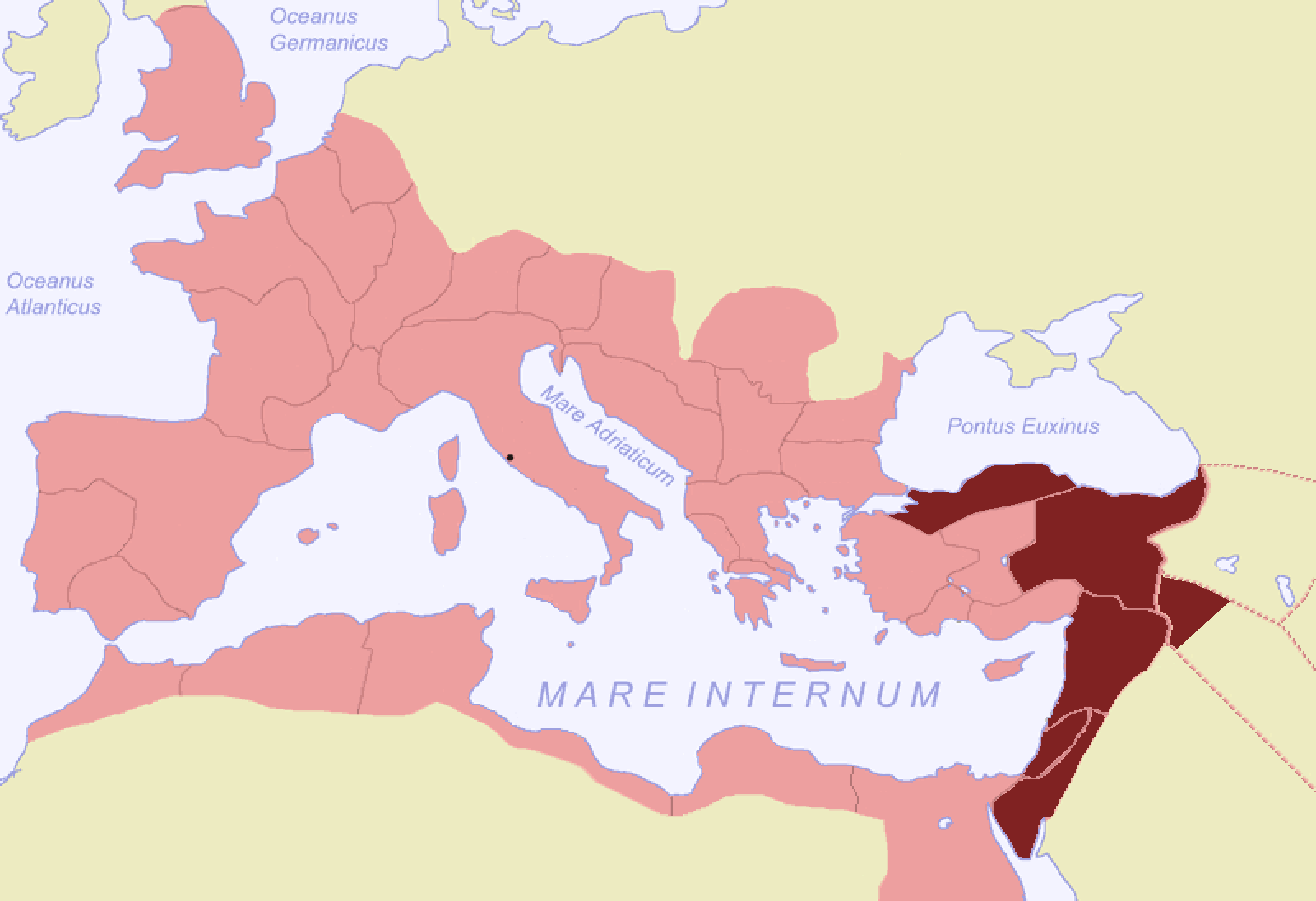
The limes Orientalis of the Roman Empire ran along the provinces of Cappadocia, Armenia, Mesopotamia, Syria and Arabia.

The Eastern limes (Latin: limes Orientalis) was the system of fortifications defending the Roman East that connected Trapezus (Trebizond) with Aelana (a settlement in the area of present-day Eilat and Aqaba), against the semi-nomadic populations of the Nabataeans, Arabs and Palmyrenes, the Kingdom of Armenia, and above all the empires of the Parthians and later the Sasanids.

==== Upper Euphrates limes ====
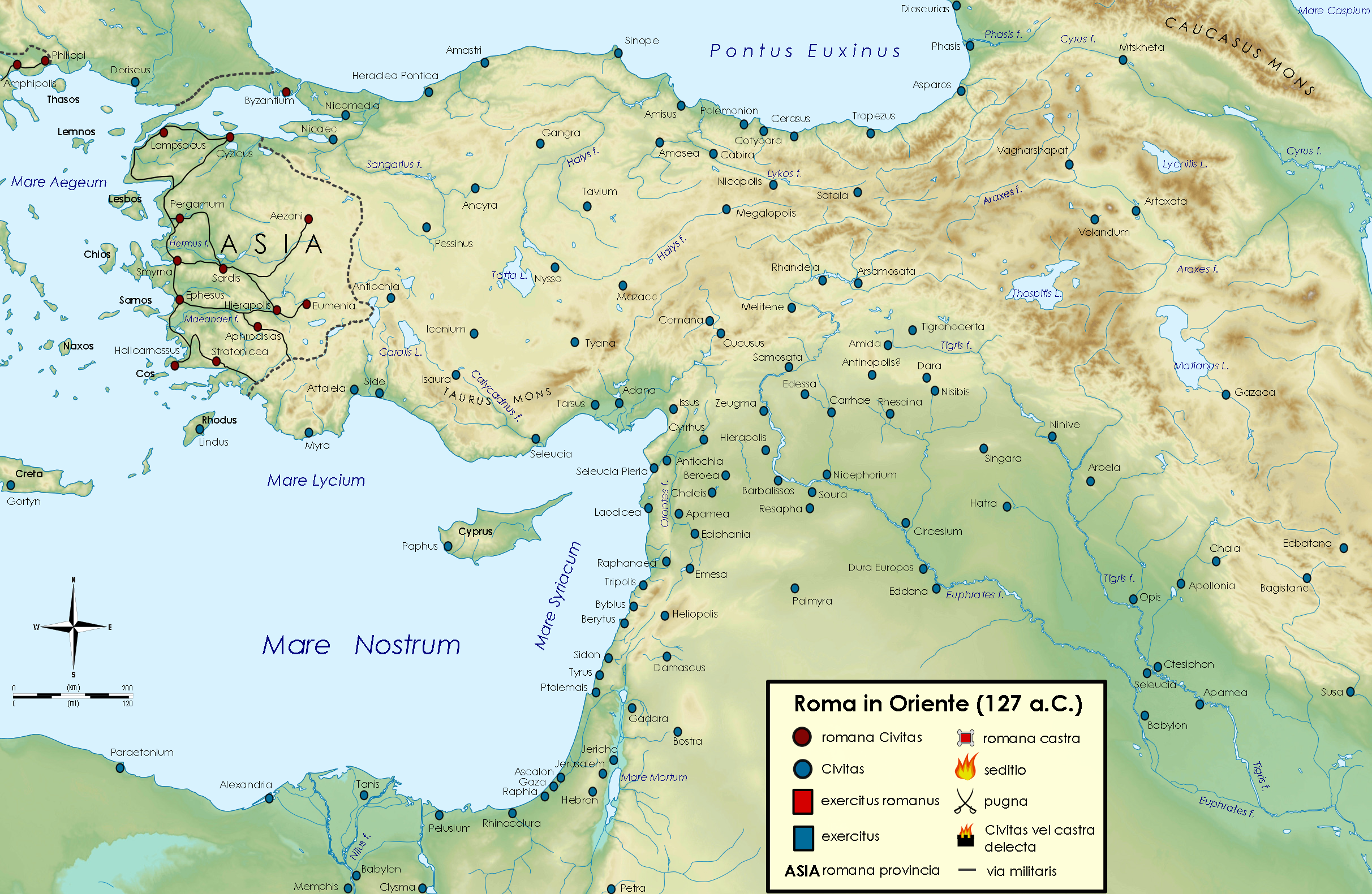
The Roman province of Asia in 127 BC, at the end of the proconsulship of Manius Aquillius, who reduced its territories in the East, beginning the construction of a road network radiating from Ephesus.

In 111 BC, Mithridates VI, son of Mithridates V, ascended the throne of the Kingdom of Pontus. The new ruler immediately pursued (from 110 BC onward) an expansionist policy in the Black Sea area, conquering all regions from Sinope to the mouths of the Danube. The young king then turned his attention to the Anatolian peninsula, where Roman power, however, was steadily growing. He knew that a clash with Rome would prove fatal for one of the two sides. At the end of the three Mithridatic Wars (89–63 BC), Rome prevailed and succeeded in annexing much of Anatolia, as far as Syria and Judaea.

West of the Euphrates, Augustus attempted to reorganize the Roman East, both by securing a non-aggression pact with the Parthian kingdom and obtaining the return of Crassus’ standards lost at Carrhae, and by incorporating some client states into Roman provinces, such as the Galatia of Amyntas in 25 BC, as well as strengthening old alliances with local rulers who became "client kings of Rome", as happened with Archelaus of Cappadocia, Asander of the Bosporan Kingdom, and Polemon I of the Kingdom of Pontus, in addition to the rulers of Iberia, Colchis and Albania.

The eastern situation was destabilized by the deaths of the king of Cappadocia Archelaus, who had come to Rome to pay homage to the new princeps, Tiberius, as well as Antiochus III, king of Commagene, and Philopator, king of Cilicia. The difficult eastern situation thus required a new Roman intervention, and in 18 Tiberius sent his adopted son Germanicus who, with Parthian consent, crowned at Artaxata the young Zeno, son of Polemon I and strongly pro-Roman, as king of Armenia. He also established that Cappadocia should be constituted as its own province, and that Cilicia should instead be incorporated into the province of Syria. Following the annexation of Cappadocia under Tiberius (17/18), a number of military forts were placed along the Euphrates to guard the northern sector of the eastern frontier.

The Roman Empire, Armenia, Osroene and the Parthian Empire around 50.

After the death of Tiberius in 37, the Parthians forced Armenia to submit, although it appears that in 47 the Romans regained control of the kingdom and granted it the status of client state. The situation remained fluid. Nero, concerned that the Parthian king Vologases I had placed his brother Tiridates on the Armenian throne, decided to send his capable general Gnaeus Domitius Corbulo in command of eastern operations. Corbulo reached a final agreement with the "King of Kings" in 63, restoring Roman prestige and concluding with Tiridates an arrangement that recognized Armenia as a Roman protectorate, which remained largely unchanged until the reign of Trajan. The region was soon shaken by the outbreak of the First Jewish–Roman War and the almost simultaneous Roman civil war of 68–69, which brought a new reorganization of the entire eastern frontier, so that two legions, Legio XII Fulminata and Legio XVI Flavia Firma, were assigned to Cappadocia from 72/73.

==== East of the Euphrates: Mesopotamia and Osroene ====
Between 224 and 226/227 an important event occurred that changed the course of relations between the Roman Empire and the Sasanian Empire: in the East the last Parthian ruler Artabanus IV was overthrown after being defeated in "three battles" and the rebel Ardashir I founded the Sasanian dynasty, destined to be Rome's eastern adversary until the 7th century.

After the death of Valerian, although the Roman Empire was under constant pressure from the Germanic-Sarmatian invasions along the northern frontier, it was forced to react to the terrible defeat of 260, which had led to the subsequent occupation of Antioch, the third largest Roman city after Rome and Alexandria. From this moment onward, for the following forty years, Roman armies advanced on at least three occasions deep into Sasanian territory, capturing their capital Ctesiphon each time: first under Odaenathus (rector totius Orientis), then under the emperors Carus and Numerian, and finally under Galerius under the supervision of Diocletian. At the end of these campaigns, Mesopotamia returned under Roman control, Armenia was recognized as a Roman protectorate, and at Nisibis the caravan routes of trade with the Far East (China and India) were concentrated. With the control of certain territories east of the Tigris, the empire reached its greatest eastern expansion (298). The entire eastern frontier system was therefore strengthened, beginning with the construction of the Strata Diocletiana in Syria and new fortified positions throughout Mesopotamia and Osroene. The peace treaty between Diocletian and the Sasanian king Narseh lasted almost forty years. The Sasanian defeat at the hands of Diocletian and Galerius (peace of 298) guaranteed the Roman Empire more than thirty years of relative peace (until 334), and northern Mesopotamia returned under Roman control. The frontier was in fact moved as far as the Khabur and the northern Tigris, passing through the Sinjar Mountains.

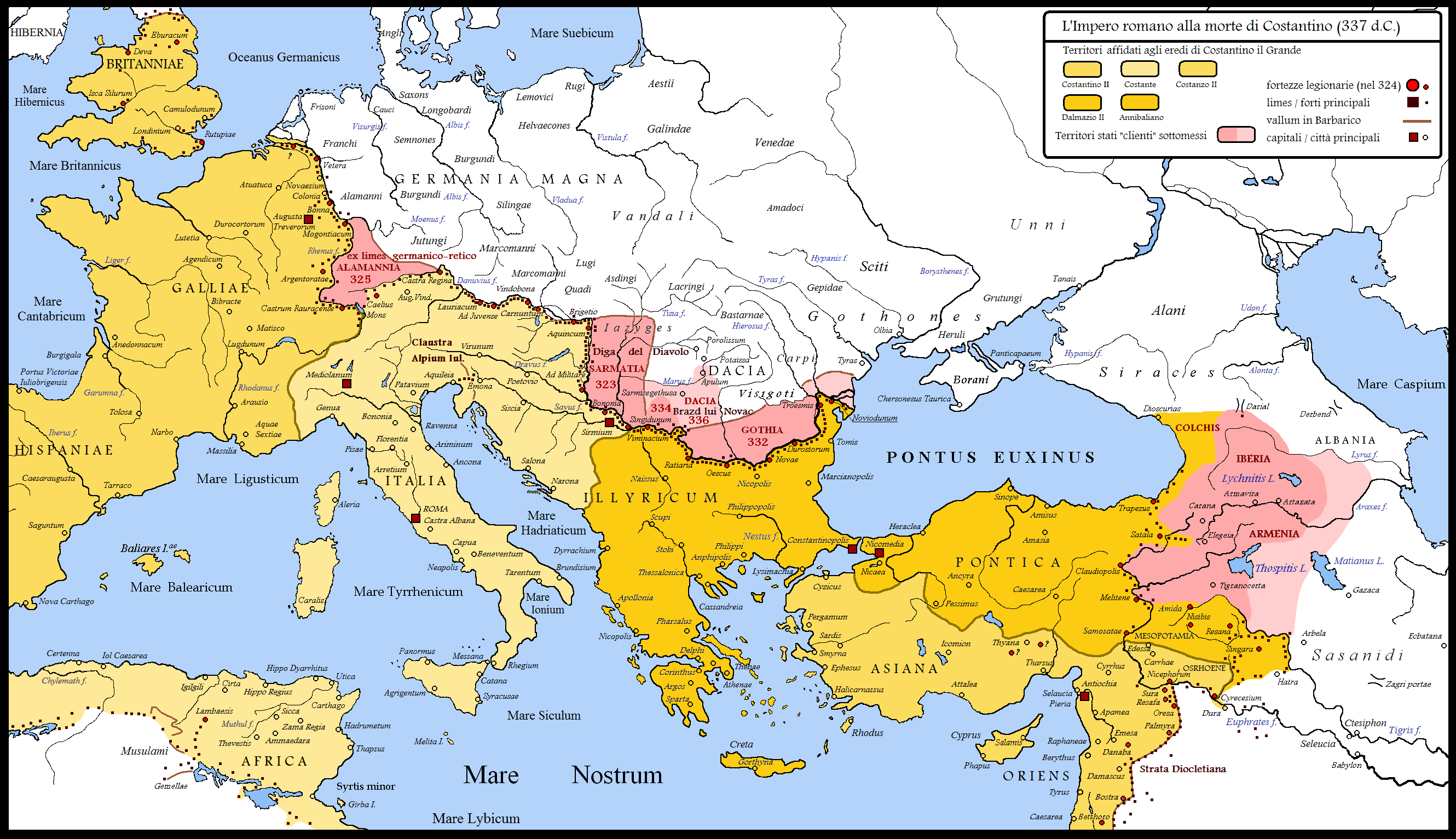
The eastern frontiers in the time of Constantine the Great, with the territories acquired during the thirty years of campaigns (306–337).

==== Limes Arabicus and the Strata Diocletiana ====
The Limes Arabicus was the frontier of the Roman province of Arabia Petraea, facing the desert. It runs from the Gulf of Aqaba in southern Palestine to northern Syria, for about 1,500 kilometers (930 mi) at its greatest extent. The purpose of this defensive limes was to protect the Roman province of Arabia from attacks by the barbarian tribes of the Arabian desert. "For over five centuries the Limes Arabicus protected the south-eastern frontier of the Roman Empire".

Augustus' presence in the East immediately after the Battle of Actium (30–29 BC) and again from 22 to 19 BC, as well as that of Marcus Vipsanius Agrippa between 23–21 BC and again between 16–13 BC, demonstrated the importance of this strategic sector. It was necessary to reach a modus vivendi with Parthia, the only power capable of challenging Rome along the eastern frontiers. In practice both empires had more to lose from defeat than they could realistically gain from victory. Parthia therefore accepted that west of the Euphrates Rome would organize states as it pleased: Augustus thus incorporated some client states into Roman provinces (such as Judaea of Herod Archelaus in 6, after disturbances at the death of Herod the Great in 4 BC) and strengthened older alliances with local rulers who now became "client kings of Rome", as occurred with the rulers of Emesa, Iturea, Commagene, Cilicia and Nabataea.

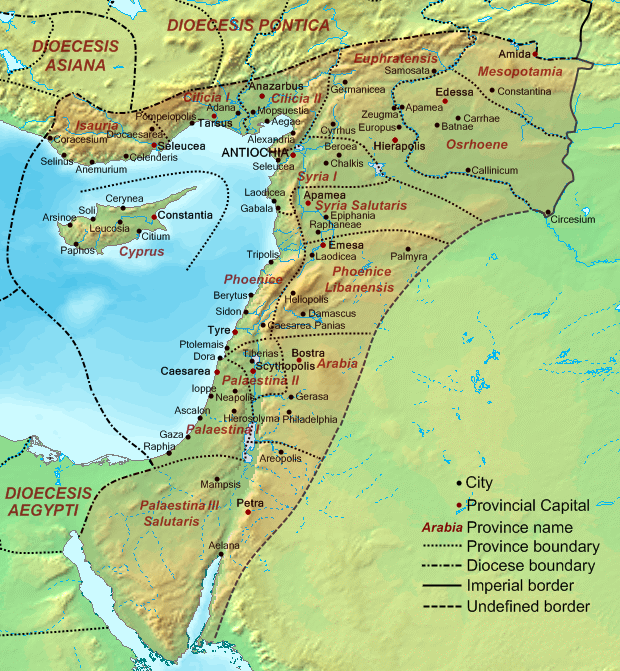
The Diocese of the East at the beginning of the 5th century.

While still preparing to conquer Dacia, Trajan arranged the annexation of Arabia Petraea (105–106), and in the following years ordered the construction of an important frontier military road: the Via Traiana Nova (between 111 and 114), which linked Aelana on the Red Sea with the legionary fortress of Bostra, 267 Roman miles away. Its primary purpose was to provide an efficient means for transporting troops and government officials. It was completed by Hadrian. Its natural continuation from the end of the 3rd century would be the Strata Diocletiana, which connected Bostra with the Euphrates.

From 230 and for the following thirty years, Sasanian armies advanced into Roman Mesopotamia, besieging numerous Roman garrisons along the Euphrates, and even conquering Mesopotamia and invading Syria, including its capital Antioch.

There was a Roman castrum every one hundred kilometres, with the aim of creating a line of protection and control.

The troops were gradually withdrawn from the Limes Arabicus in the first half of the 6th century and replaced by native Arab foederati, particularly the Ghassanids.

=== Southern frontier (Africa) ===
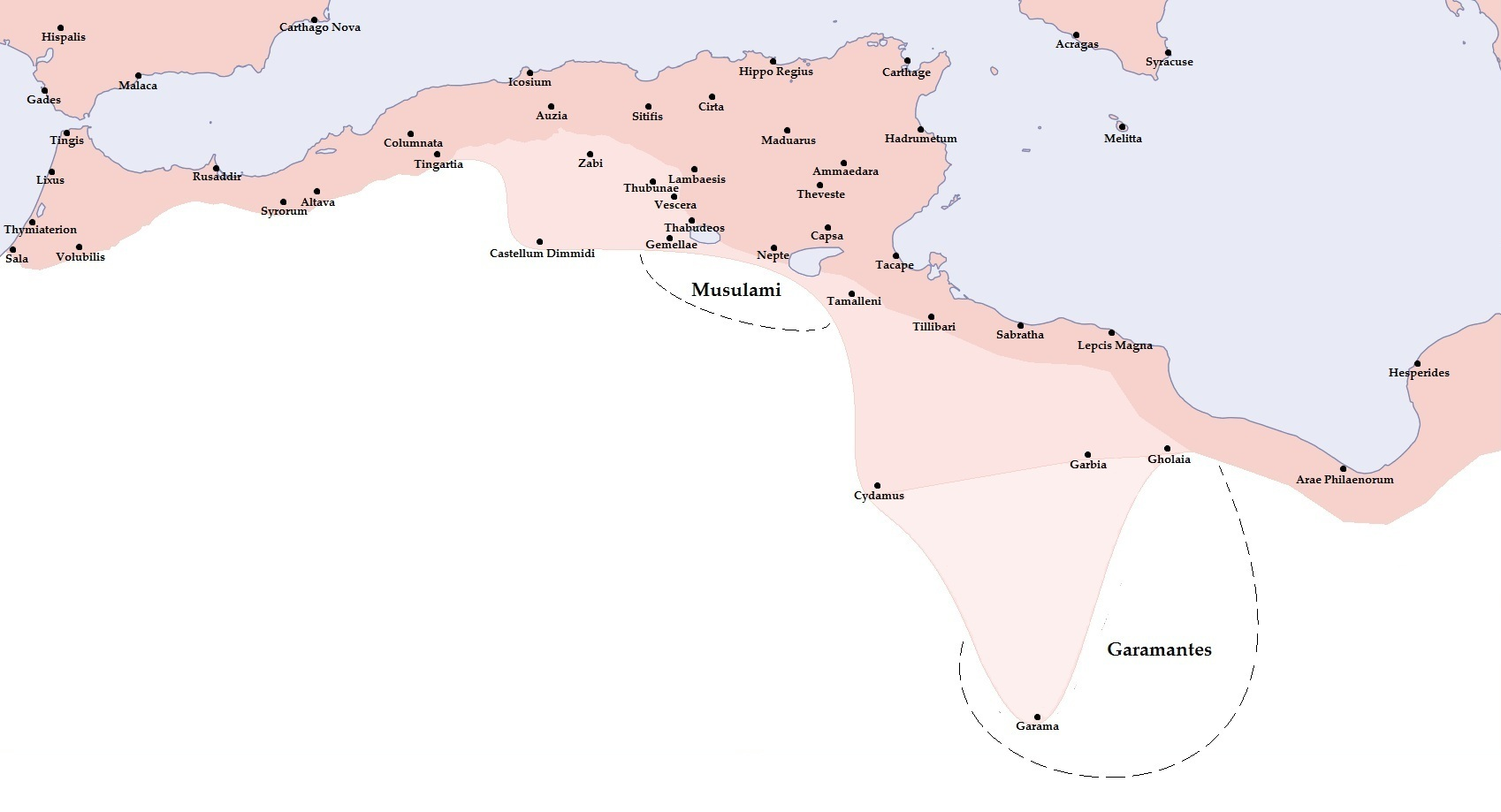
Limes Africanus under Septimius Severus (the frontier of Roman Africa (dark tan) in the late 2nd century AD: Septimius Severus expanded the Limes Tripolitanus dramatically (medium tan), even briefly holding a military presence (light tan) in the Garamantian capital Garama in 203)

Of the three land frontiers of the Roman Empire, the southern one was the longest. From Rabat in Morocco to Suez on the Red Sea in Egypt it measured about 4,000 km as the crow flies. But the Roman frontier actually ran about a thousand kilometres south of Cairo, and its course from there to the Atlantic Ocean was far from straight.

And Libya [that is, North Africa] is - as others explain, indeed as Gnaeus Calpurnius Piso once told me when he governed that region - like a leopard's skin, because it is dotted with inhabited places surrounded by arid and desert lands. The Egyptians call these inhabited places "oases".

— Strabo, Geography, II, 5, 33

At the greatest extent of the Roman Empire, the southern border lay along the deserts of Arabia in the Middle East (see History of the Romans in Arabia) and the Sahara in North Africa, which represented a natural barrier against expansion. The Empire controlled the Mediterranean shores and the mountain ranges further inland. The Romans attempted twice to occupy the Siwa Oasis and finally used Siwa as a place of banishment. However Romans controlled the Nile many miles into Africa up to the modern border between Egypt and Sudan.

In Africa Romans controlled the area north of the Sahara, from the Atlantic Ocean to Egypt, with many sections of limes (Limes Tripolitanus, Limes Numidiae, etc.).

The Fossatum Africae ("African ditch") of at least 750 km controlled the southern borders of the Empire and had many similarities of construction to Hadrian's Wall.

There are similar, but shorter, fossatae in other parts of North Africa. Between the Matmata and Tabaga ranges in modern Tunisia there is a fossatum which was duplicated during World War II. There also appears to be a 20 km fossatum at Bou Regreg, in Morocco, although this would not have been within the scope of the proclamation of the Codex Theodosianus because at that time the province was not in Africa, administratively speaking.

In the south of Mauritania Tingitana the frontier in the third century lay just north of Casablanca near Sala and stretched to Volubilis.

Septimius Severus expanded the "Limes Tripolitanus" dramatically, even briefly holding a military presence in the Garamantian capital Garama in 203 AD. Much of the initial campaigning success was achieved by Quintus Anicius Faustus, the legate of Legio III Augusta.

Following his African conquests, the Roman Empire may have reached its greatest extent during the reign of Septimius Severus, under whom the empire encompassed an area of 2 million square miles (5.18 million square kilometers).

==== Western African limes ====
Numerous peoples were fought and incorporated into the Roman Empire in the age of Augustus, between 35 BC and AD 6, as recorded in the Fasti triumphales of the period.

The African limes with the main military positions (in red) of the western provinces of Africa Proconsularis and the Mauretanias.

From the time of Trajan, the borders of Africa Proconsularis expanded southwards and westwards, occupying territories formerly belonging to the Kings of Numidia, up to the highlands of the Aures Mountains. Two fortified lines were established, one north and one south of the Aurès mountains, guarded by numerous forts and fortlets (in addition to the legionary fortress of Lambaesis) and integrated by a continuous Fossatum Africae with outposts extending into the desert.

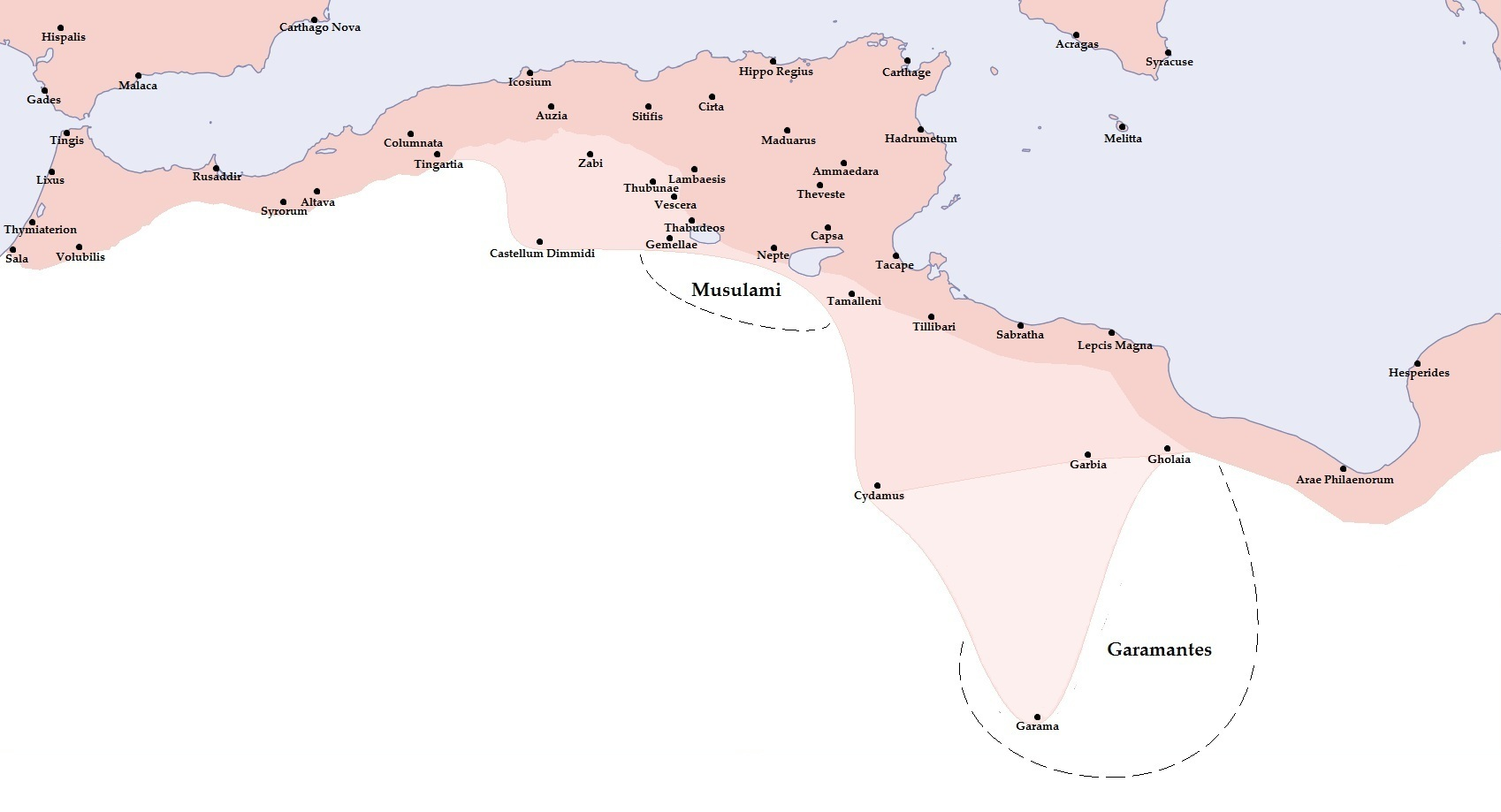
The African frontier (dark brown) in the late 1st century AD. Septimius Severus greatly expanded the Limes Tripolitanus (lighter brown). There was also, briefly, a Roman military presence in the Garamantian capital Garama in 203.

As for the Limes Tripolitanus, it was the last section of the limes Africanus to be organized, again thanks to Septimius Severus, who brought the Roman Empire to its greatest expansion in North Africa and paid particular attention to this frontier sector.

A similar development occurred in the Mauretanian frontier sector, also under Septimius Severus, when a further southward advance in Caesariensis was accompanied by the construction of a new military road with forts, fortlets and watchtowers. A zone thus formed between the two roads (that of Trajan and Hadrian, and this later one of Septimius Severus), called Nova Praetentura, where a form of defence in depth was implemented, whose territories served as a buffer zone for nomadic or semi-nomadic populations to the south.

With the rise of Diocletian, the empire underwent a radical internal transformation, especially at the military level. Divided into four parts (two Augusti and two Caesares), it was further divided into 12 dioceses, each entrusted to a vicarius, subordinate to one of the four Praetorian prefects. The vicarius in turn supervised all the provincial governors (variously titled proconsules, consulares, correctores, praesides). The troops stationed in each diocese were placed under a comes rei militaris, dependent directly on the magister militum and commanding the duxes responsible for military command in individual provinces. At the end of 297 the Augustus Maximian campaigned in Mauretania, defeating the tribe known as the Quinquegentiani, who had also penetrated Numidia. The following year (298) he reinforced the African frontier from the Mauretanias to Africa Proconsularis.

==== Fossatum Africae ====
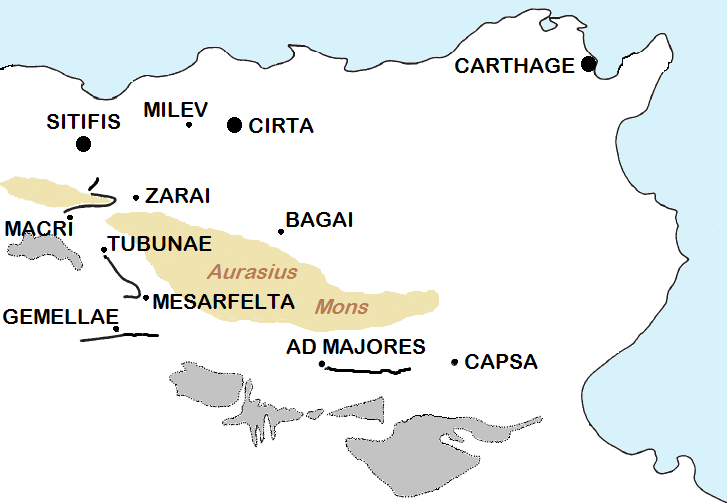
Black lines indicating the approximate path of the 4 sections of the Fossatum Africae

Fossatum Africae ("African ditch") is a linear defensive structure (limes) that extended over 750 km or more in northern Africa constructed during the Roman Empire to defend and control the southern borders of the Empire in the Roman province of Africa. It is considered to have many similarities of construction to Hadrian's Wall at the northern border of the Empire in Britain. Generally the Fossatum consists of a ditch and earth embankments on either side using the material from the ditch. Sometimes the embankments are supplemented by dry stone walls on one or both sides; rarely, there are stone walls without a ditch. The width of the Fossatum is generally 3–6 m but in exceptional cases may be as much as 20 m. Wherever possible, it or its highest wall is constructed on the counterscarp. Excavations near Gemellae showed the depth there to be 2–3 m, with a width of 1 m at the bottom widening to 2–3 m at the top.

The Fossatum is accompanied by many small watchtowers and numerous forts, often built within sight of one another.

==== Eastern African limes ====
Map of the ancient Egyptian frontier.

The defence of the eastern African region mainly concerned the valley of the Nile (a narrow strip of fertile land within surrounding desert, crucial for the grain supply of Rome), the Mediterranean coasts from Egypt to Cyrenaica, certain landing points on the Red Sea (such as Berenice Troglodytica), important for trade with the Far East (from which spices and luxury goods were imported) and with the Kingdom of Aksum, and finally the mountainous area of the Eastern Desert, rich in mines of gold, emeralds, granite and porphyry.

In 96 BC Ptolemy Apion of the Ptolemaic dynasty became the last Hellenistic ruler of Cyrenaica. At his death he bequeathed his kingdom to the Roman Republic. The new territories were organized into a Roman province only in 74 BC with the arrival of the first legatus pro praetore, assisted by a quaestor. It consisted of five cities of Greek origin forming the so-called Cyrenaican Pentapolis. After the Battle of Philippi the region was assigned to Mark Antony, who in 36 BC granted it to Cleopatra Selene II, daughter of Cleopatra VII; this situation lasted until the Battle of Actium. Once victorious, Octavian became the undisputed master of Rome. He established the province of Egypt in 30 BC. Egypt thus became an imperial province. A few years later (27 BC), within the reform of provincial administration, Augustus united Crete and Cyrene into a single senatorial province, governed by a proconsul of praetorian rank, with capital at Gortyn on Crete. These events were followed by numerous pacification campaigns along the eastern African frontier, through which many populations were fought and incorporated into the Roman Empire between 29 BC and AD 1, as also recorded in the Fasti triumphales.

In the time of Domitian (around 85–86), the tributary people of the Nasamones (living south of the African coast between Cyrenaica and Leptis Magna) rebelled, but were soon annihilated, so that Domitian reportedly declared before the Senate: "I have forbidden the Nasamones to exist."

There was later a gradual reduction in the number of legions stationed in the area (from three to only one), which should not be misleading: the decrease in legionary forces corresponded to an increase in auxiliary forces. While there were few external dangers, the internal situation instead saw a progressive increase in social tensions, from banditry in the countryside to open revolts, such as the Jewish uprising of 115–117 or the revolt of the Bucoli in 172, during the reign of Marcus Aurelius, caused by excessive taxation.

Under Diocletian, in 290 the Saracens are mentioned for the first time, an Arab tribe settled in the Sinai Peninsula that had attempted to invade Syria. At the end of 297 the Augustus Maximian defeated the Quinquegentiani in Mauretania and in 298 strengthened the African frontier from the Mauretanias to Africa Proconsularis. In 298 the territories of the Dodecaschoenus were abandoned and entrusted to the Nobatae as foederati against the Blemmyes.

== Post-Roman limites ==
The Limes Saxoniae in Holstein was established in 810 AD, long after the fall of the Western Roman Empire. Charlemagne considered his empire (later called the Carolingian Empire) as the true successor to the Roman Empire and called himself "Emperor of the Romans". Official edicts were issued in Latin, which affected the naming of the Empire's frontier as well.

== In fiction ==
- The novel series Romanike is set at the Limes Germanicus in the decades until the first assault of Germanic peoples in 161 AD.
- Roman Wall: A Novel, by Winifred Bryher is set in 265 during the Limesfall.

== Gallery ==
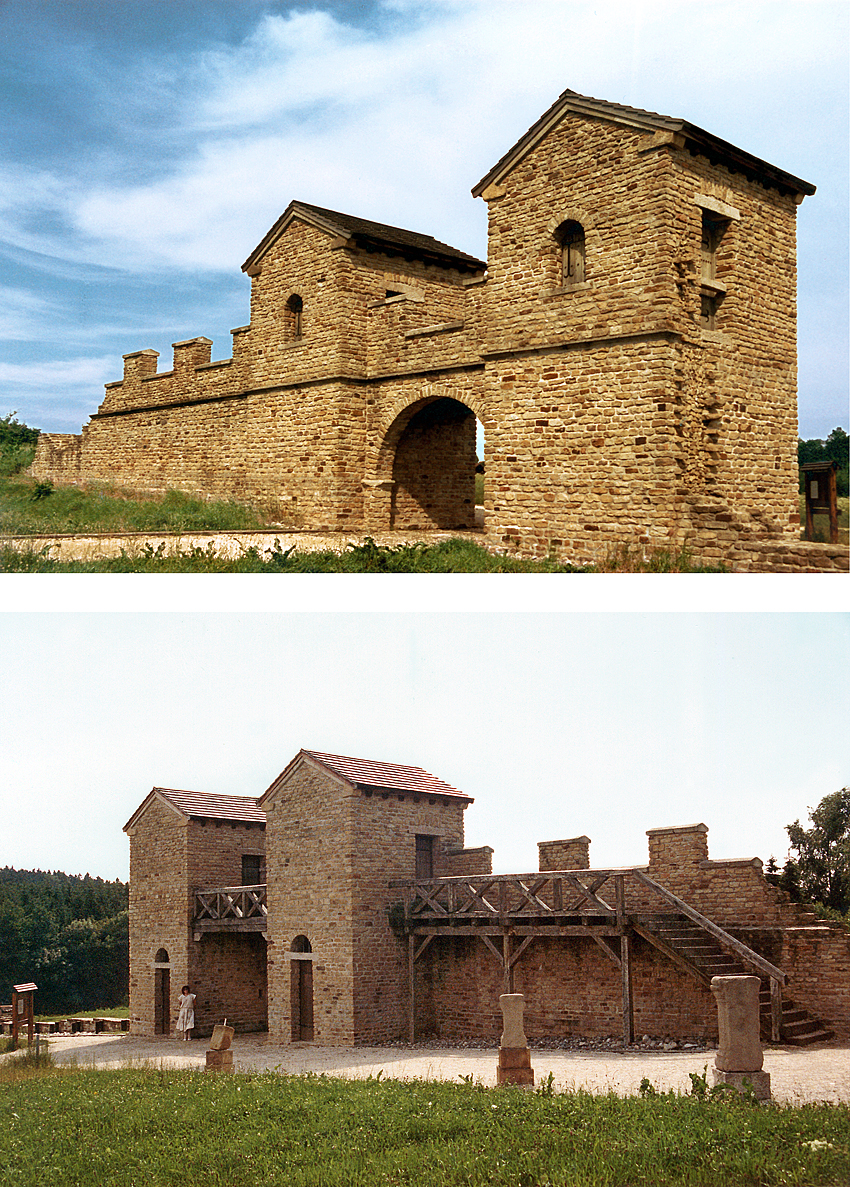
Reconstructed east gate of the fort at Welzheim, Germany

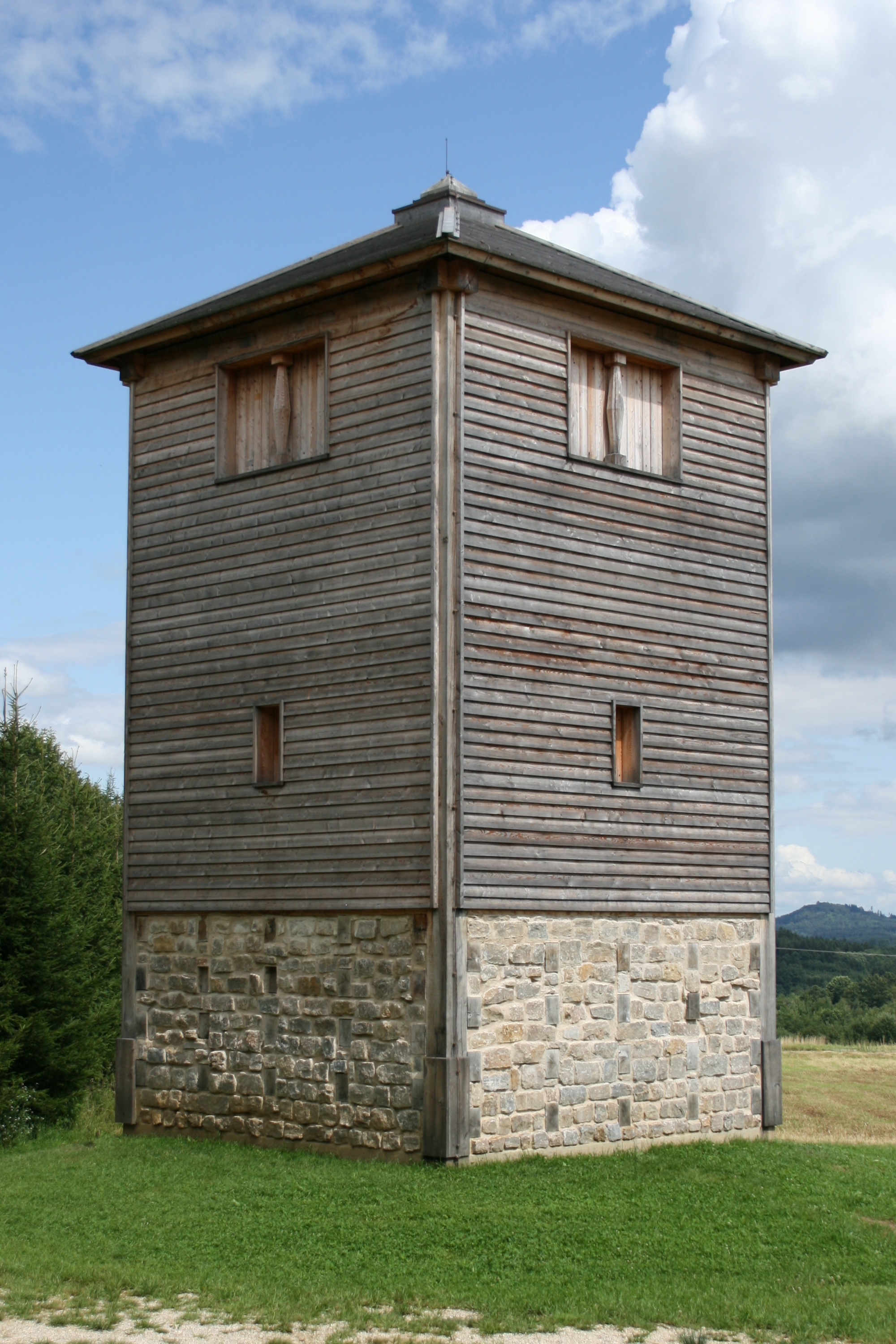
Reconstructed wooden tower nearby Rainau, Germany

== See also ==
- Roman military frontiers and fortifications
- Great Wall – structures of similar scale and function, built by various dynasties in China
- Sasanian defense lines – the borders of the Neo-Persian Empire
- Limitanei – soldiers on the late Roman and early Byzantine limites
- March (territorial entity) – medieval European borderlands
- The Pale – the English-controlled strip of Ireland

== Bibliography ==
- AAVV, The world of imperial Rome: its formation, Bari 1989.
- Geraci, Giovanni; Marcone, Arnaldo (2004). Storia romana [Roman history]. Florence: Le Monnier. ISBN 88-00-86082-6.
- M. Grant, The Roman emperors, Rome 1984.
- E. Luttwak, The grand strategy of the Roman Empire, Milan 1981.
- H. M. D. Parker, The Roman Legions, Cambridge 1958.
- S. Rinaldi Tufi, Archaeology of the Roman provinces, Rome 2007.
- C. Scarre, The Penguin historical atlas of ancient Rome, 1995. ISBN 0-14-051329-9
- J. S. Wacher, The Roman world, New York 2002, ISBN 0-415-26314-X

=== Limes Congress ===
- 1st International Congress of Roman Frontier Studies, edited by E. Birley, Durham 1952;
- 2nd International Congress of Roman Frontier Studies, edited by E. Swoboda, Graz-Cologne 1956;
- 3rd International Congress of Roman Frontier Studies, edited by R. Laur-Belart, Basel 1959;
- 4th International Congress of Roman Frontier Studies, Durham 1959;
- 5th International Congress of Roman Frontier Studies, edited by Grga Novak, Zagreb 1964;
- 6th International Congress of Roman Frontier Studies, edited by H. Schonberger, Cologne-Graz 1967;
- 7th International Congress of Roman Frontier Studies, edited by S. Appelbaum, Tel Aviv 1971;
- 8th International Congress of Roman Frontier Studies, edited by E. Birley, B. Dobson and M. Jarrett, Cardiff 1974;
- 9th International Congress of Roman Frontier Studies, edited by D. M. Pippidi, Bucharest 1974;
- 10th International Congress of Roman Frontier Studies, edited by D. Haupt and H. G. Horn, Cologne 1974;
- 11th International Congress of Roman Frontier Studies, edited by J. Fitz, Budapest 1977;
- 12th International Congress of Roman Frontier Studies, edited by W. S. Hanson and L. J. F. Keppie, Oxford 1980;
- 13th International Congress of Roman Frontier Studies, edited by C. Unz, Stuttgart 1986;
- 14th International Congress of Roman Frontier Studies, edited by H. Vetters and M. Kandler, Vienna 1990;
- 15th International Congress of Roman Frontier Studies, edited by V. A. Maxfield and M. J. Dobson, Exeter 1991;
- 16th International Congress of Roman Frontier Studies, edited by W. Groenman-van Waateringe, B. L. van Beek, W. J. H. Willems and S. L. Wynia, Exeter 1997;
- 17th International Congress of Roman Frontier Studies, edited by N. Gudea, Zalau 1999;
- 18th International Congress of Roman Frontier Studies, edited by P. Freeman, J. Bennett, Z. T. Fiema and B. Hoffmann, Oxford 2002;
- 19th International Congress of Roman Frontier Studies, edited by Z. Visy, Pecs 2003;
- 20th International Congress of Roman Frontier Studies, edited by Angel Morillo Cerdan, Leon 2006.
