= Dux Belgicae secundae =

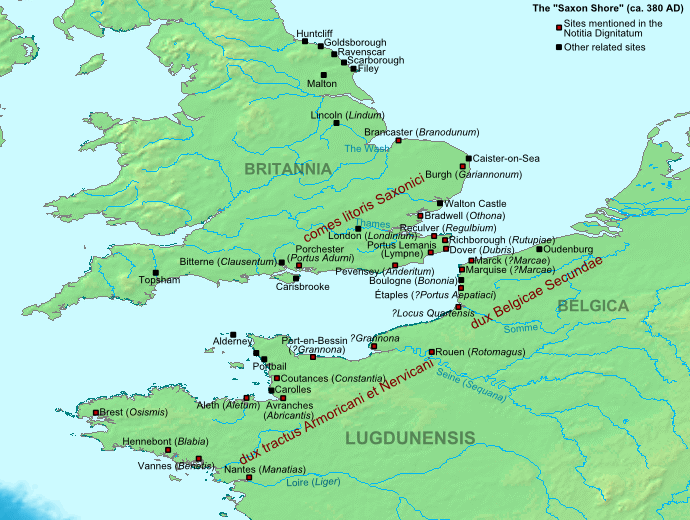
- The Saxon Shore (Litus saxonicum) around the year 380.
- Active: end of the fourth century to the fifth century
- Country: Roman Empire
- Type: commander of a stretch of the Rhine limes and Litus Saxonicum (Saxon Shore)

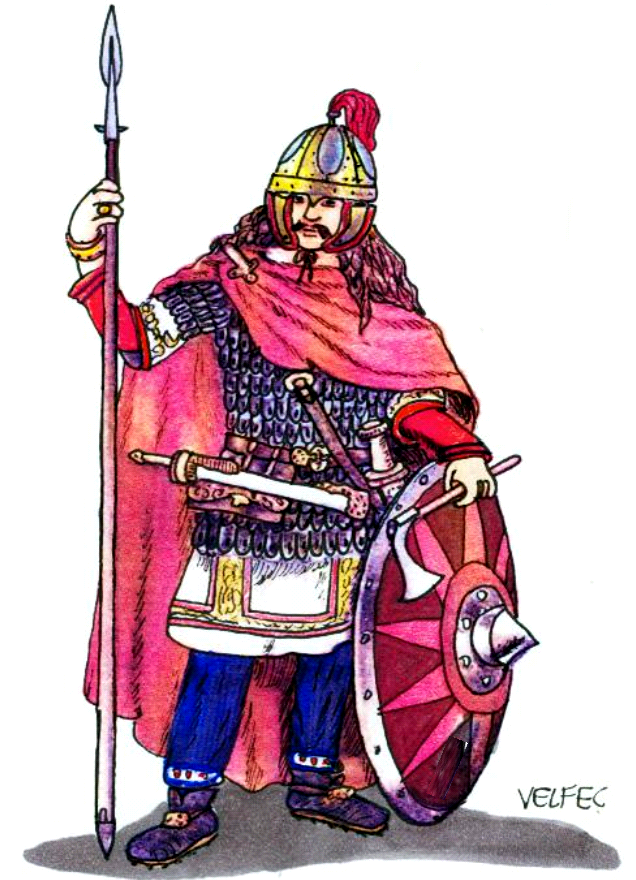
Childeric in the equipment of a late Roman officer, 5th century, reconstruction attempt after discovered in the 17th century grave goods

The Dux Belgicae secundae ("commander of the second Belgic province") was a senior officer in the army of the Late Roman Empire who was the commander of the limitanei (frontier troops) and of a naval squadron on the so-called Saxon Shore in Gaul.

The office is thought to have been established around 395 AD. At the imperial court, a dux was of the highest class of vir illustris. The Notitia Dignitatum lists for the Gallic part of the Litus Saxonicum ("the Coast of Saxony") two commanders, and their military units, who were charged with securing the coasts of Flanders (Belgica II), of Normandy (Lugdunensis II), and of Brittany (Lugdunensis III), these commanders being the Dux Belgicae secundae and the neighboring Dux Armoricani et Nervicani.

These two commanders were the successors to an official the Comes Maritimi Tractus (Commander of the Coastal Regions), who formerly commanded both the British and the Gallic part of the Saxon Shore. These two commanders maintained coastal defenses until the mid–5th Century. A well known commander was the Frankish king Childeric I (late 5th century).

== History ==
In the course of the imperial reforms under Emperor Diocletian new military offices were introduced in Britain and Gaul. At that time the limes (border wall/marker) of the Saxon coast were established on both sides of the English Channel. The castles guarding the heavily exposed sections and estuaries were partially restored or modified from existing structures. Their garrisons had the task of repelling raiders and impeding the access of invaders to the interior. The main responsibility for securing both coasts was in the middle of the 4th century placed in a Comes Maritimi Tractus. In 367, an invasion of Britain by several barbarian peoples, almost completely wiping out units of the local provincial forces, killing the coastal commander Nectaridus. His area of responsibility must have been divided thereafter—by 395 at the latest—into three military districts. This most likely was also to prevent a military commander from having too many soldiers under his command, thus enabling him to start an uprising (such as the usurpation of the British fleet commander Carausius). For the Gallic part of the Saxon coast, two new ducal regions were created, which existed until the early 5th century.

In the final phase of Roman rule over Gaul, Childeric, as civilian administrator and commander of the warrior groups around the town of Tournai in the north of the province, acted as the commander of the Salian Franks. Tournai served as his residence and administrative headquarters. His power was based upon, among other things, the weapon forges here. In Childeric's grave, discovered in 1653, Eastern Roman gold coins, a gold-plated officer's coat (paludamentum), and a golden onion button brooch were found. The first was interpreted as renumeratio (payment) for services rendered, the last as an insignia of the late Roman army.

It is unclear whether Childeric acted as merely a Roman general or independently as a king (rex gloriosissimus); most likely, both offices had already merged. Childeric was probably still loyal to the late Roman military aristocracy of Gaul. In any case, it was not the formal powers that mattered, but the power based on commanding a military resources. This combining of civilian and military offices in his hands suggests that Childeric had a prominent position among barbarian army commanders. He had probably been directly confirmed in his office by the administration of Odoacer in Italy and also by the Eastern Roman imperial court. It is believed that he had precedence before the other federal commander in chief. As rex or princeps he would also have been entitled to bestow religious and secular offices and the associated titles—such as patricius, comes, and dux—to deserving Teutons or Romans in his domain (regnum).

== Administrative staff ==
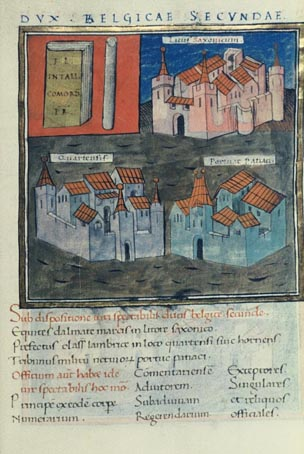
Dux Belgicae secundae from Notitia dignitatum: the forts on Litus Saxonicum ("the Saxon shore", symbolically represented as one fort), and the fortress cities Quartensis and Portuae Patiaci, all under the command of the Dux Belgicae secundae. Text: Dux Belgicae secundae. Sub dispositione viri spectabilis ducis Balgicae secundae : Equites Dalmatae, Marcis in litore Saxonico. Praefectus classis Sambricae, in loco Quartensi siue Hornensi. Tribunus militum Neruiorum, Portu Epatiaci. Officium autem habet idem uir spectabilis dux hoc modo : Principem ex eode corpore. Numerarium. Commentariensem. Adiutorem. Subadiuuam. Regrendarium. Exceptores. Singulares et reliquos officiales.

The officium (administrative staff) of the dux included the following offices:

- Princeps ex eodem corpore (chancellor from the ranks of the army)
- Numerarii (two accountants)
- Commentariensus (legal counsel)
- Adiutor (assistant)
- Subadiuva (assistant)
- Regerendarius (administrator)
- Exceptores (secretaries)
- Singulares et reliquos officiales (notaries (or bodyguards) and other civil servants)

== Forts, officers, and units ==
In addition to the administrative staff (officium), eight tribunes or prefects and their units were available to the Dux (sub dispositione, "at discretion"):

- Equites Dalmatae (no officer stated).
- Praefectus classis Sambricae, commander of a flotilla of patrol ships (Navis lusoria), the fourth since the Century on the Somme was stationed. Their bases were in locus Quartensis, or Vicus ad Quantiam, (Port d'Etaples, France, north of the Somme estuary) and locus Hornensis (possibly Cap Hornu, Saint-Valery-sur-Somme, France).

Tribunus militum Nerviorum, a prefect for Sarmatian settlers (Praefectus Sarmatarum gentilium, inter Renos et Tambianos secundae provinciae Belgicae), and four prefects that commanded the contingents of Germanic Laeti:

- Praefectus laetorum Nerviorum in Fanomantis (modern Famars, Picardie, France)
- Praefectus laetorum Batavorum Nemetacensium in Atrabatis (modern Arras, Pas de Calais, France)
- Praefectus laetorum Batavorum Contraginnensium in Noviomago
- Praefectus laetorum gentilium in Remo et Silvanectas

Their shield emblems are not shown in the Notitia Dignitatum.

The Dux had originally more units under his command. Arnold Hugh Martin Jones identified the origin of some units as being from the Gallic army. They originated from Belgica II. Their names are the same as the well-known cities of this province:

- Geminiacenses, a legio comitatenses, (from Geminiacum – modern Liberchies, Hainaut, Belgium); comitatenses – having been assigned to a field army, but without being awarded the higher designation of "palatine" status
- Cotoriacenses, a legio comitatenses (from Cotoriacum – West Flanders)
- Prima Flavia (Prima Flavia Metis) (a pseudo-comitatenses from Metis)

Unlike the vexillarii of other duces, these units are not shown as being under the command of the Dux Belgicae II. It seems that this province had diminished influence after the destruction of the border units on the Rhine (Rhine crossing of 406 AD), at which many of their units were transferred to the field army.

== See also ==
- Count of the Saxon Shore
