= Limitanei =

Provincial units of the Later Roman Empire

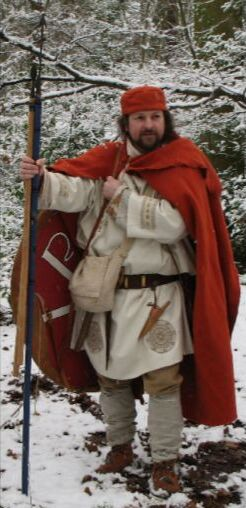
A re-enactor portraying a Roman Limitaneus

The limitanei (Latin, also called ripenses), meaning respectively "the soldiers in frontier districts" (from the Latin word limes meaning frontier) or "the soldiers on the riverbank" (from the Rhine and Danube), were an important part of the late Roman and early Byzantine army after the reorganizations of the late 3rd and early 4th centuries.The limitanei, unlike the comitatenses, palatīni, and scholae, garrisoned fortifications along the borders of the Roman Empire and were not normally expected to fight far from their fortifications.

The limitanei were lower-status and lower-paid than the comitatenses and palatīnī, and the distinction in role and status between scholae, palatini, comitatenses, and limitanei had largely replaced the older one between praetorians, legionaries, and auxiliaries. The limitanei and palatini both included legionary units alongside auxiliary units.

The nature of the limitanei changed considerably between their introduction in the 3rd or 4th century and their disappearance in the 6th or 7th century. In the 4th century, the limitanei were professional soldiers, and included both infantry and cavalry as well as river flotillas, but after the 5th century they were part-time soldiers, and after the 6th century they were unpaid militia.

The role of the limitanei remains somewhat uncertain. Hugh Elton and Warren Treadgold suggest that, besides garrisoning fortifications along the frontier, they operated as border guards and customs police and to prevent small-scale raids. They may have driven off medium-scale attacks without the support of the field armies. Edward Luttwak saw their role as a key part in a strategy of defence-in-depth in combination with the provincial field armies.

== Origins and history ==
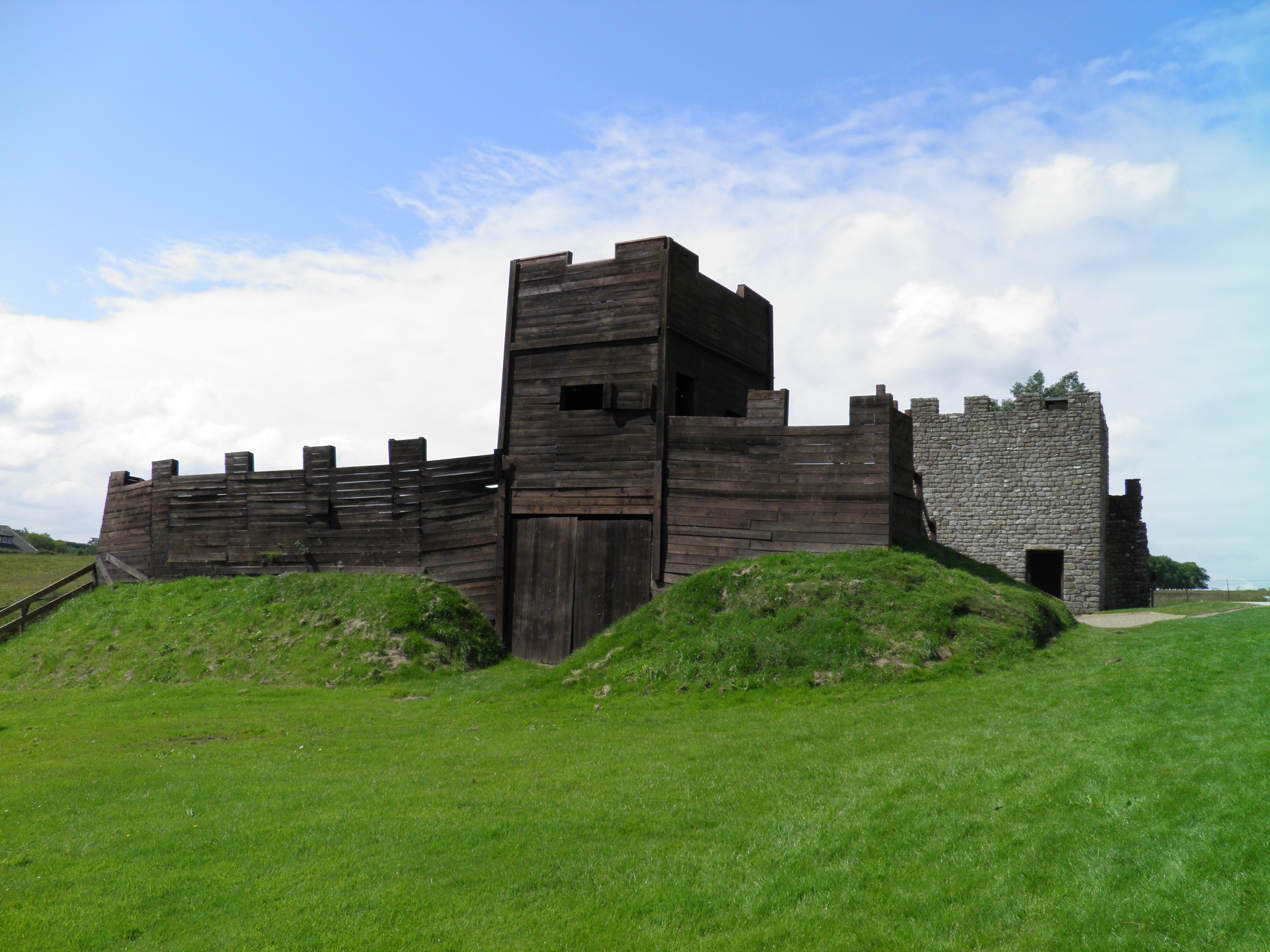
Reconstructed Roman fortifications at Vindolanda. The limitanei would garrison similar forts around the Empire.

In the early 3rd century, the Roman military was organized into several provincial armies under the command of the provincial governors, a smaller reserve under the command of the emperor, guard units such as the Praetorian Guard, and the urban cohorts. (Note: The reserve would include the Legio II Parthica. Although Septimius Severus may not have used it as a reserve, his successors did.) Field armies were temporary formations, usually composed of the reserve and/or of detachments drawn from the provincial armies. In the later 3rd century, due to the frequent wars, field armies could remain together for several years, under the direct command of the emperor, and would require their own recruitment systems.

By the mid 4th century, the Roman military was divided into frontier armies under the command of the provincial duces and permanent field armies under the command of the emperor, the magistri peditum, magistri equitum, or comites. The frontier armies would patrol the borders and oppose small-scale raids. They may have driven off medium-scale attacks without the support of the field armies. The frontier armies would later be known as limitanei or ripenses. The field armies would respond to larger-scale attacks, would fight against rival emperors, and would conduct any large-scale attacks into neighboring countries. The field armies would later be known as comitatenses or palatini. The first known written reference to ripenses was in 325 and the first to limitanei was not until 363.

Historians disagree on whether the emperor Diocletian, or one of his successors, such as Constantine I, split the Roman military into frontier armies and field armies. Theodor Mommsen, H.M.D. Parker, and more recently, Warren Treadgold and David S. Potter attribute the reorganization to Diocletian. E.C. Nischer, D. van Berchem, and more recently, M.C. Bishop and J.C.N. Coulston attribute mainly an expansion to Diocletian, and the reorganization to Constantine I and his successors. Karl Strobel sees the reorganization as the culmination of trends going back well into the 3rd century, with Diocletian strengthening both the frontier and field armies.

The division of the Roman Empire, the collapse of its western portion, and the formation of the successor states means that the limitanei may have developed differently in the east and the west, or even in different regions of the west.

In the east, the emperor Justinian cancelled their pay. After this, the eastern limitanei were no longer professional soldiers, but continued to exist as militia through the Persian Wars and the Arab Conquest.

The Arabic ajnad of Palestine, Jordan, Damascus, and Homs, may represent continuations of the commands of Palaestina, Arabia, Phoeniciae, and Syria.

In the west, the collapse of the empire cut off regular pay. Peter Heather notes an incident in the Life of St. Severinus, in Noricum in the 460s, where raiders had intercepted and cut down limitanei who were bringing their pay to the rest of their unit.

== Organization ==
The limitanei represented the largest part of the late Roman Army. The eastern portion of the Notitia Dignitatum, from about 395, may count some 195,500 personnel in the frontier armies not counting the river flotillas, 104,000 in the field armies not counting the fleets, and 3,500 in the palace guard. The western portion, from about 420, is harder to work with, because it has been unevenly edited, it omits some frontier provinces, and it includes British provinces which were probably lost to the Empire.

The size of the army, and therefore of the limitanei, remains controversial. A. H. M. Jones and Warren Treadgold argue that the late Roman army was significantly larger than earlier Roman armies, and Treadgold estimates they had up to 645,000 troops. Karl Strobel denies this, and Strobel estimates that the late Roman army had some 435,000 troops in the time of Diocletian and 450,000 in the time of Constantine I.

The limitanei were usually under the command of the duces of their respective provinces. There were some exceptions, with comites commanding units of limitanei, and with duces commanding units from two or more provinces.

The units of the limitanei included legiones of infantry, often divided between two bases and sometimes divided among more, numeri, milites, and cohortes of infantry, as well as vexillationes, equites, cunei, and alae of cavalry. The size of the legions is unclear. A.H.M. Jones suggested that they could have as many as 3,000 troops, because they are often listed with 10 cohorts, and because they are sometimes divided among many bases. Warren Treadgold suggests that the legions probably had about 1,000 troops and the other units probably had about 500 troops each. The different titles of numeri, milites, and cohorts, or vexillationes, equites, cunei, and alae, probably did not correspond with different structures or roles, although according to Pat Southern and Karen Dixon, the legiones, auxilia, and cunei of the border armies were part of the limitanei, but higher-status than the older cohortes and alae in the same armies. Warren Treadgold estimates that 50.1% of the limitanei were infantry and 49.9% cavalry, not counting river flotillas.

== Roles ==
The role of the limitanei remains somewhat uncertain.

Neither Vegetius, writing in the late 4th or early 5th century, nor Mauricius, writing in the late 6th century, discuss the limitanei in their military manuals. This is understandable. Vegetius called for the revival of earlier Roman practices, from before the organization of the limitanei, and Mauricius wrote after the decline of the limitanei.

Hugh Elton and Warren Treadgold suggest that, besides garrisoning fortifications along the frontier, they operated as border guards and customs police and to prevent small-scale raids. Hugh Elton describes their roles as "policing the border, gathering intelligence, and stopping raids". They may have driven off medium-scale attacks without the support of the field armies. Edward Luttwak saw their role as a key part in a strategy of defence-in-depth, manning a range of defences from forts to walled towns in a deep defensive zone. These defences would deny routes to the enemy, securing food stocks and, in arid areas, water supplies both to restrict attackers and facilitate counterattack by provincial field armies

Because units of limitanei operated in one area, had their own camps, and often recruited from the same area, they tended to maintain better relations with the locals than the comitatenses and palatini, who would often be transferred to other areas, and were often quartered in civilian homes.

They were light troops and served as a policing force to patrol Rome's distant, far-flung border regions and when necessary, to delay advancing enemy forces until counter-attacks could be arranged. They worked in conjunction with the comitatenses.

=== Pseudocomitatenses ===
The relationship between the limitanei, of the border armies, and the pseudocomitatenses, the lowest-ranking units of the field armies, remains unclear. Theodor Mommsen proposed that the pseudocomitatenses were former units of limitanei incorporated into the mobile field armies, and most authors since have followed his theory. E.C. Nischer proposed the alternate theory that the pseudocomitatenses were positional garrison units which were independent of the border armies and thus placed under the same command as the field armies.

=== Farmer-soldiers ===
In the past historians have suggested that the limitanei were organized as units of part-time farmer-soldiers. In this view, the limitanei were used in stationary roles along the frontier and were granted plots of land to cultivate, which essentially turned them into part-time soldiers/farmers. It was usually assumed that over time the limitanei settled down more permanently in their posts and became farmers and land owners as well as soldiers; raising families and earning a living from agricultural means rather than purely military service. It is now more generally assumed that there is no good evidence for this.

The current consensus seems to be that the limitanei were organized as units of professional soldiers, but they gradually became part-time soldiers and eventually an unpaid militia, relying on other professions including farming for income.

Why this new class of soldiers developed is disputed by historians. According to Azar Gat, many scholars believe that empires stationed these soldiers on the outskirts of empires as a first line of defense against raiding barbarians tribes. As the soldier profession is often not productive (prolonged periods of training with only occasional conflict), empires had long resorted to this principle of "military colonists". Thus, the late Roman empire adopted the system of limitanei (frontier-colonist-soldier) for economic reasons. By employing soldiers in this way, Rome was able to capitalize on their knowledge of warfare as well benefit from the agriculture produced by limitanei. Edward Luttwak, however, sees the change as due a strategic shift away from a firmly held frontier (preclusive defence) to a less firmly held frontier zone backed with mobile forces (defence-in-depth) as responsible for the change, though again referencing parallels of military colonists at other times in history.

== Equipment ==
M. C. Bishop and J. C. N. Coulston, in a major work on Roman military equipment, do not distinguish that of the limitanei from that of the comitatenses and palatini. It is doubtful whether there were any universal differences between the equipment of the limitanei and of the other forces.

The late Roman empire had centralized fabricae, introduced by Diocletian, to provide arms and armor for the army.

The 4th century limitanei included both light and heavy infantry, (Note: The Notitia Dignitatum does not seem to list any infantry units of sagittarii in the limitanei, so this should be taken cum grano salis.) as well as light and heavy cavalry, (Note: The Notitia Dignitatum attests several cavalry units of sagittarii, and one unit of catafractarii, the last under the Dux Scythiae.) and river flotillas.

== Fortifications ==
The limitanei garrisoned fortifications along the borders of the Roman empire. Hugh Elton divides these into four categories: "garrison forts, detachment forts, watchtowers, and fortified landing places". These fortifications could be organized into lines along rivers, such as the Rhine and Danube, or at times part of the Euphrates, along fortified walls such as Hadrian's Wall, or along otherwise unfortified roads such as the Strata Diocletiana.

Garrison forts are those at or near the towns along the frontiers, as well as other forts, garrisoned by independent units of limitanei.

Detachment forts are those too small for independent units, garrisoned by detachments from the nearest garrison fort.

Fortified landing places are those on the opposite side of riverine borders.

Both Diocletian and Constantine I reinforced the frontier fortifications. The fort of Deutz/Divitia, an important bridgehead on the east bank of the Rhine, was built in this period. Generally speaking there were more and smaller forts along the late Roman border than along the earlier Roman imperial borders. This has been interpreted as evidence that units were smaller than before, that units were divided among multiple forts, or both.

== Effectiveness ==
The effectiveness of the limitanei, as units, and as part of the larger system, remains controversial.

The soldiers of the frontier armies were paid less than their counterparts in the field armies. However, this does not imply that the field armies always hired the most promising recruits; some may have preferred to stay close to home rather than to join units which could be deployed anywhere else. The soldiers of the frontier armies are often supposed to have been part-time farmer-soldiers without the same degree of training as the soldiers of the field armies; however, they were originally full-time soldiers.

Although these military reforms brought about a more effective defensive army than the previous arrangement had, it did have its pitfalls.

Constantine I was criticised for allowing what were perceived as "second-class" infantry, often recruited from non-Roman backgrounds, to be given the responsibility of watching over Rome's most troublesome regions. The elite comitatenses and Scholae Palatinae (the personal bodyguards of the late Roman Emperors such as Constantine I) resented being reduced to trivial home guard duties and acting more similarly to an urban police force until such a time that a serious enough threat presented itself at a nearby border, when they were called upon for duty.

They are historically significant in that their appearance, as part of a plan of military reforms enacted in the late 3rd century, was able to extend the life of the Roman Empire by pushing back the great barbarian invasions of late antiquity.

The quality of these border troops declined because the limitanei had to live in poor conditions in impoverished and isolated towns, unlike their well-off counterparts the comitatenses, who were typically assigned to more urban and prosperous areas of the empire. This affected the discipline and morale of the late Roman army. A factor that should also be examined and considered, is how the limitanei ended up as part time forces and eventually even, not being paid at all. Traditionally, the quality of troops degrades as they spend less and less time as active soldiers, and soldiers that aren't being sent their wages, are obviously not being sent new equipment, or money to repair or replace broken equipment.

The limitanei were nonetheless a fairly well equipped and trained force of infantry for their time, especially in relation to other standing armies of the day fielded by Rome's Germanic, Celtic, Iranian, and Eastern neighbours, collectively referred to as "barbarians" by the Romans themselves.

It can be surmised, due in part to these reforms, that the Western Roman Empire continued to live on for another 140 years after the end of Constantine's reign, in the face of numerous migrations and invasions from northern and eastern, nomadic peoples such as the Huns, Goths (Ostrogoths, Visigoths and Gepids), Vandals, Sarmatians, Alans, Burgundians, Saxons and Franks, which continually weakened the Empire until its eventual collapse in 476 AD.

== In popular culture ==
The limitanei are in Rome Total War: Barbarian Invasion as an infantry unit that can be recruited by any Roman faction. They are a cheap and easily trained unit that has poor attack, but very high defense, simulating their role in holding the frontier and bogging down enemies while the field armies mobilized.

In Civilization VI: Rise and Fall, limitanei are available as a military policy. The policy causes military units to increase the loyalty of the city they are garrisoned in.

In Age of Empires IV, limitanei are cheap anti-cavalry infantry available for the Byzantines.

== See also ==
- Akritai
- Marzoban
