= Siege of Antioch (260) =

Siege Part of the Roman–Persian Wars

- Part of Shapur I's third Roman campaign
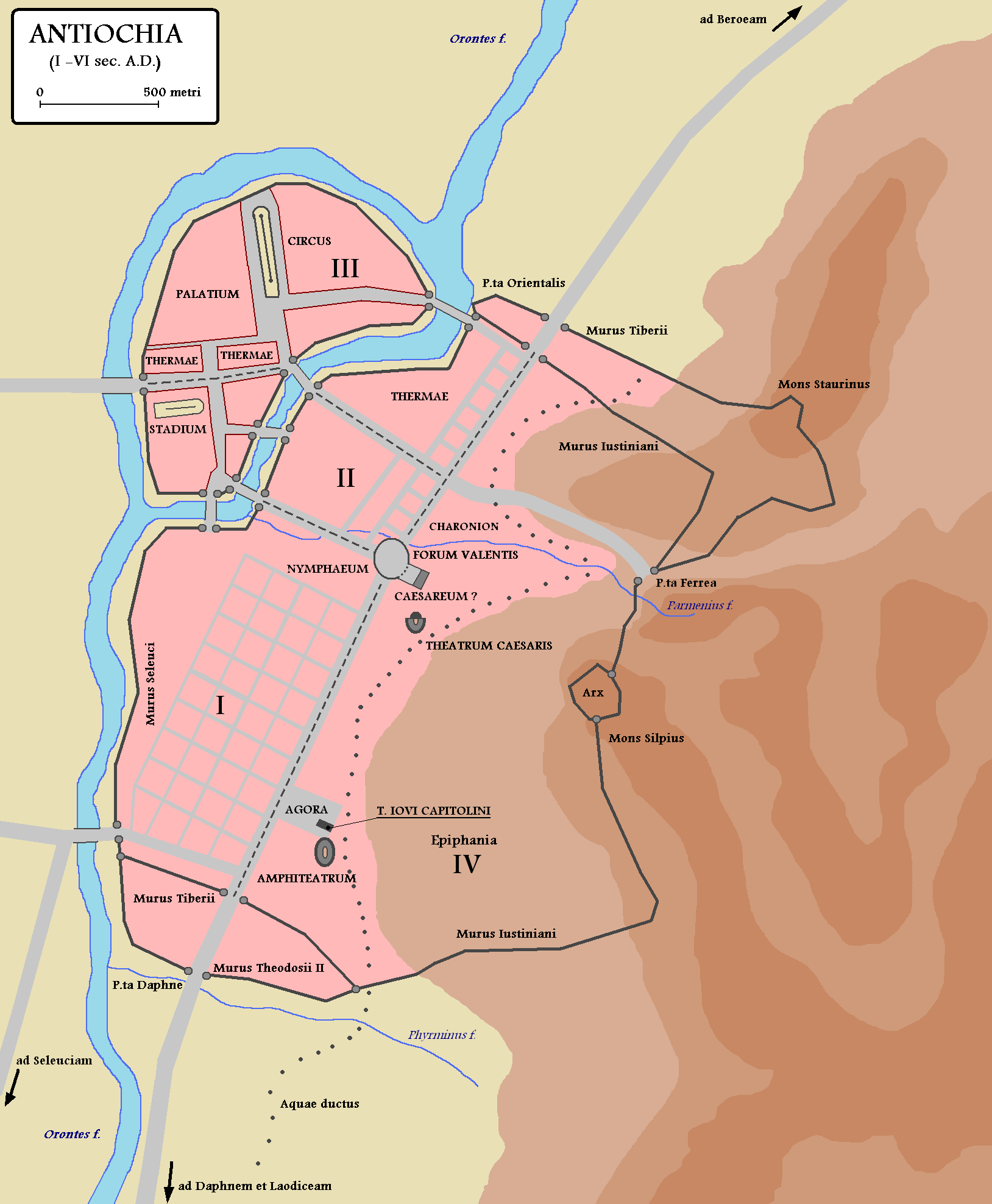
- Map of Antioch in Roman times
Date	260
Location	Antioch (modern-day Antakya, Hatay, Turkey)
Result	Sasanian victory
Territorial changes	The Sasanian Empire conquers Antioch

Belligerents
Roman Empire	Sasanian Empire

Commanders and leaders
Unknown	Shapur I

The siege of Antioch was a battle fought between the Sasanian Empire and the Roman Empire in 260 AD. In this battle, Shapur I first besieged the city and was able to conquer Antioch for the second time by penetrating the city wals.

== Description ==
After a series of campaigns against the Roman Empire (252-256),Shapur I faced Emperor Valerian in Edessa for the third time, which led to the defeat of the Romans and the capture of Valerian and the high Roman officialsValerian spent the last days of her life in prison. After this victory, Shapur decided to launch a new attack on the cities of Antioch, Cilicia and Caesarea.Shapur first attacked Antioch, besieged this city and after penetrating its walls, conquered this city. With this victory, Shapur destroyed all the Roman provinces in Mesopotamia and expelled the Romans from there.
