= Strata Diocletiana =

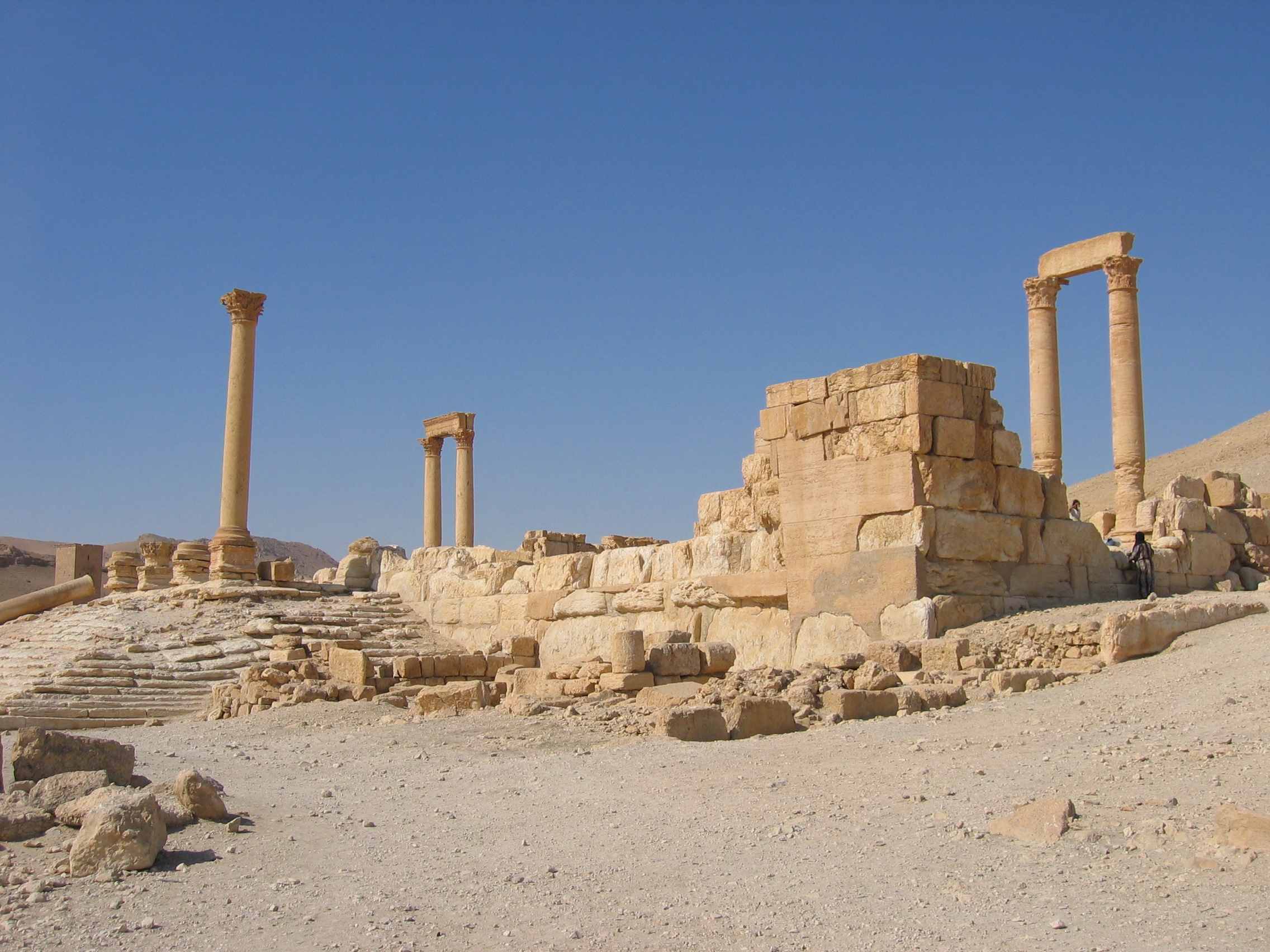
Access to the Principia in the Diocletian Town Fortress of Palmyra.

The Strata Diocletiana (Latin for "Road of Diocletian") was a fortified road that ran along the eastern desert border, the limes Arabicus, of the Roman Empire. As its name suggests and as it appears on milestones, it was constructed under Emperor Diocletian (r. 284–305 AD) as part of a wide-ranging fortification drive in the later Roman Empire. The strata was lined with a series of similarly-built rectangular forts (quadriburgia) situated at one day's march (ca. 20 Roman miles) from each other. It began at the southern bank of the river Euphrates and stretched south and west, passing east of Palmyra and Damascus down to northeast Arabia.
