= Imperial Roman army =

Roman Empire from about 27 BC to 476 AD

Roman army
- Exercitus Romanus
- Vexillum with the imperial aquila
- Active: 27 BC to 476 AD
- Country: Roman Empire
- Type: Army
- Role: Land warfare
- Size: 450,000 (211 AD)
- Part of: Roman military
- Nicknames: List of names
- Equipment: List of equipment
- Decorations: List of decorations

Commanders
- Commander-in-chief: Emperor (de facto); Consuls (de jure)

The Imperial Roman Army was the military land force of the Roman Empire from 27 BC to 476 AD, and the final incarnation in the long history of the Roman army. This period is sometimes split into the Principate (27 BC – 284 AD) and the Dominate (284–476) periods.

Under Augustus (r. 27 BC – AD 14), the army consisted of legions, eventually auxilia and also numeri. By the end of Augustus' reign, the imperial army numbered some 250,000 men, equally split between 25 legions and 250 units of auxiliaries. The numbers grew to a peak of about 450,000 by 211, in 33 legions and about 400 auxiliary units. By then, auxiliaries outnumbered legionaries substantially. From this peak, numbers probably underwent a steep decline by 270 due to plague and losses during multiple major barbarian invasions. Numbers were restored to their early 2nd-century level of c. 400,000 (but probably not to their 211 peak) under Diocletian (r. 284–305).

After the Empire's borders became settled (on the Rhine-Danube line in Europe) by AD 68, virtually all military units (except the Praetorian Guard) were stationed on or near the borders, in roughly 17 of the 42 provinces of the empire in the reign of Hadrian (r. 117–138).

== History ==
=== Background ===
The army of the late Republic that Augustus took over on becoming sole ruler of the Empire in 27 BC consisted of a number of large (5,000-strong) formations called legions, which were composed exclusively of heavy infantry. The legion's light infantry (velites) which had been deployed in earlier times (see Roman army of the mid-Republic), had been phased out as had its contingent of cavalry. Legions were recruited from Roman citizens only (i.e., from Italians and inhabitants of Roman colonies outside Italy), by regular conscription, although by 88 BC, a substantial proportion of recruits were volunteers.

To remedy the deficiencies in capability of the legions (heavy and light cavalry, light infantry, archers and other specialists), the Romans relied on a motley array of irregular units of allied troops, both composed of subject natives of the empire's provinces (called the peregrini by the Romans) and of bands supplied, often on a mercenary basis, by Rome's allied kings beyond the Empire's borders. Led by their own aristocrats and equipped in their own traditional fashion, these native units varied widely in size, quality and reliability. Most would only be available for particular campaigns before returning home or disbanding.

=== Establishment ===
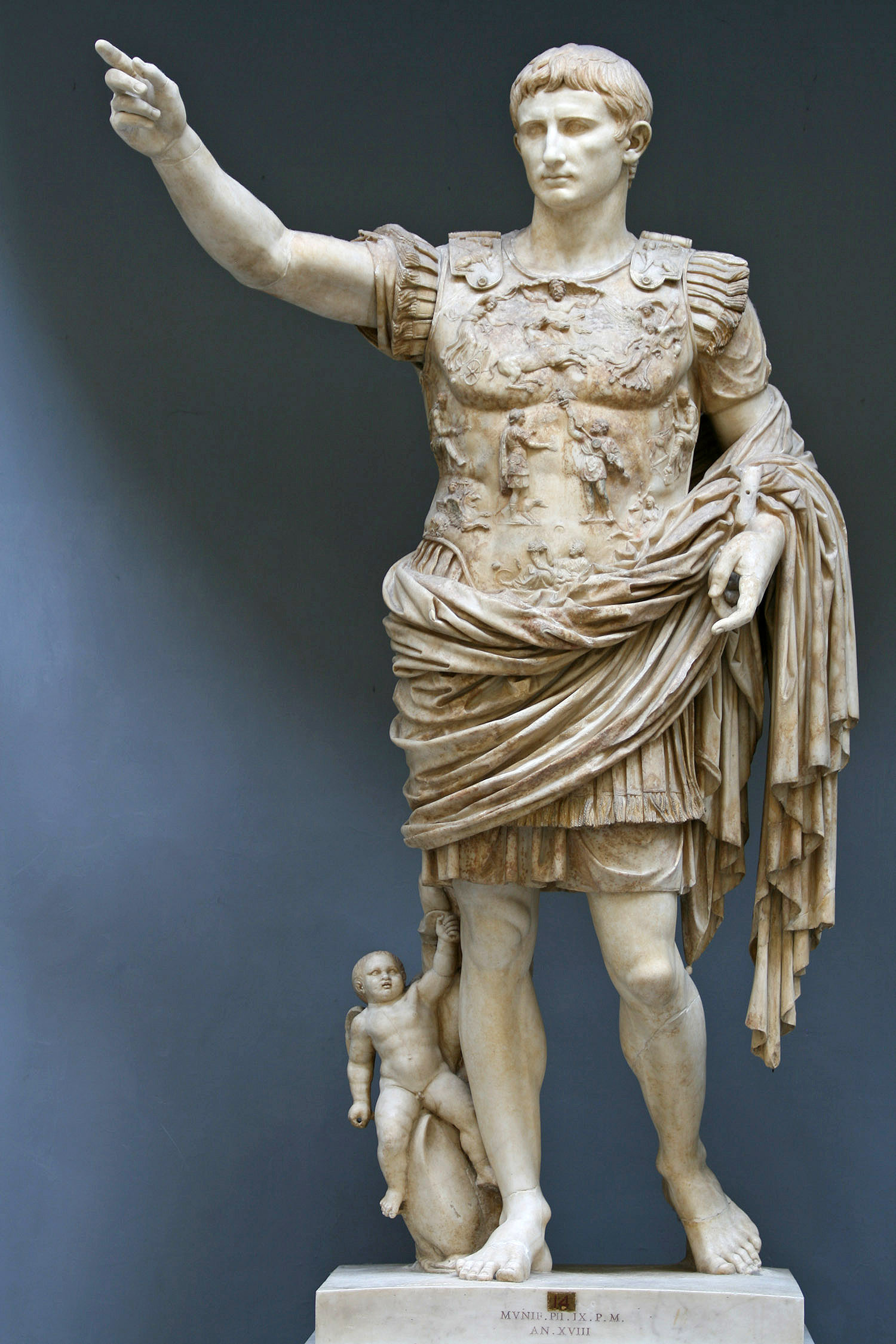
Statue of the founder-emperor Augustus in garb of military commander-in-chief

On gaining undisputed mastery over the Roman empire in 27 BC, Augustus (sole rule 27 BC – AD 14) was left with an army which was bloated by extraordinary recruitment for the Roman civil wars and at the same time lacking a suitable organisation for the defence and expansion of a vast empire. Even after disbanding most of his defeated adversary Mark Antony's legions, Augustus had 50 legions under his command, composed exclusively of Roman citizens i.e., by that time, of Italians and inhabitants of Roman colonies outside Italy. Alongside these were a mass of irregular non-Italian allied units whose command, size and equipment varied greatly. Some allied units came from provinces within the empire, others from beyond the imperial borders.

==== Legions ====
The first priority was to reduce the number of legions to a sustainable level. Fifty legions implied too high a recruitment burden for a male citizen-body only about two-million strong, especially as Augustus intended to create a long-term career force. The Emperor retained just over half his legions, disbanding the rest and settling their veterans in no less than 28 new Roman colonies. The number of legions remained close to that level throughout the Principate (varying between 25 and 33 in number).

Unlike the Republican legions, which were, in theory at least, temporary citizen-levies for the duration of particular wars, Augustus and his right-hand man Agrippa clearly envisioned their legions as permanent units composed of career professionals. Under the late Republic, a Roman citizen iunior (i.e. male of military age: 16–46 years) could legally be required to serve a maximum of sixteen years in the legions and a maximum of six years consecutively. The average number of years served was about ten. In 13 BC, Augustus decreed sixteen years as the standard term of service for legionary recruits, with a further four years as reservists (evocati). In AD 5, the standard term was increased to twenty years plus five years in the reserves. In the period following its introduction, the new term was deeply unpopular with the troops. On Augustus' death in AD 14, the legions stationed on the rivers Rhine and Danube staged major mutinies, and demanded, among other things, reinstatement of a sixteen-year term. Augustus prohibited serving legionaries from marrying, a decree that remained in force for two centuries. This measure was probably prudent in the early imperial period, when most legionaries were from Italy or the Roman colonies on the Mediterranean, and were required to serve long years far from home. This could lead to disaffection if they left families behind. But from about AD 100 onwards, when most legions were based long-term in the same frontier-province and recruitment was primarily local, the prohibition of marriage became a legal encumbrance that was largely ignored. Many legionaries formed stable relationships and brought up families. Their sons, although illegitimate in Roman law and thus unable to inherit their fathers' citizenship, were nevertheless frequently admitted to legions.

At the same time, the traditional grant of land to retiring veterans was made replaceable by a cash discharge bonus, as there was no longer sufficient state-owned land (ager publicus) in Italy to distribute. Unlike the Republic, which had relied primarily on conscription (i.e. compulsory levy), Augustus and Agrippa preferred volunteers for their professional legions. Given the onerous new term of service, it was necessary to offer a substantial bonus to attract sufficient citizen-recruits. In AD 5, the discharge bonus was set at 3,000 denarii. This was a generous sum equivalent to about 13 years' gross salary for a legionary of the time. To finance this major outlay, Augustus decreed a 5% tax on inheritances and 1% on auction-sales, to be paid into a dedicated aerarium militare (military treasury). However, veterans continued to be offered land instead of cash in Roman colonies established in the newly annexed frontier provinces, where public land was plentiful (as a result of confiscations from defeated indigenous tribes). This was another grievance behind the mutinies of 14 AD, as it effectively forced Italian veterans to settle far from their own country (or lose their bonus). The imperial authorities could not compromise on this issue, as the planting of colonies of Roman veterans was a crucial mechanism for controlling and Romanising a new province, and the foundation of veterans' colonies did not cease until the end of Trajan's rule (117). But as legionary recruitment became more localised (by AD 60, over half of recruits were not Italian-born), the issue became less relevant.

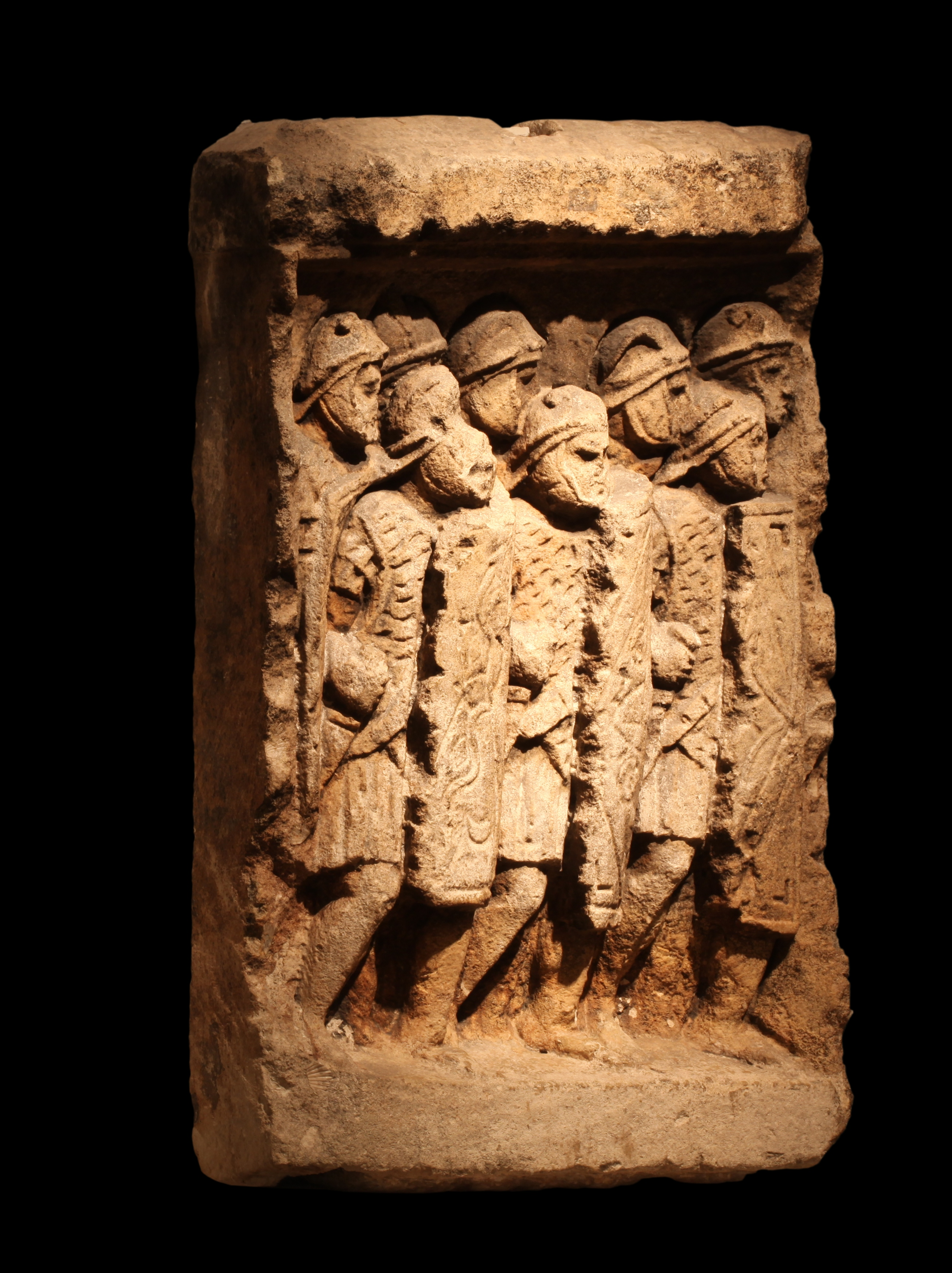
Imperial Roman legionaries in testudo formation, a relief from Glanum, a Roman town in what is now southern France that was inhabited from 27 BC to 260 AD

Augustus modified the command structure of the legion to reflect its new permanent, professional nature. In Republican tradition (but ever less in practice), each legion was under six equestrian military tribunes who took turns to command it in pairs. But in the late Republic, military tribunes were eclipsed by higher-ranking officers of senatorial rank called legati ("literally "envoys"). A proconsul (Republican governor) might ask the senate to appoint a number of legati to serve under him e.g., Julius Caesar, Augustus' grand-uncle and adoptive father, had five, and later ten, legati attached to his staff when he was governor of Cisalpine Gaul (58–51 BC). These commanded detachments of one or more legions at the governor's behest and played a critical role in the conquest of Gaul. But legions still lacked a single, permanent commander. This was provided by Augustus, who appointed a legatus to command each legion with a term of office of several years. The ranking senatorial military tribune (tribunus militum laticlavius) was designated deputy commander, while the remaining five equestrian tribunes served as the legatus' staff officers. In addition, Augustus established a new post of praefectus castrorum (literally "prefect of the camp"), to be filled by a Roman knight (often an outgoing centurio primus pilus, a legion's chief centurion, who was usually elevated to equestrian rank on completion of his single-year term of office). Technically, this officer ranked below the senatorial tribune, but his long operational experience made him the legion commander's de facto executive officer. The prefect's primary role was as the legion's quartermaster, in charge of legionary camps and supplies.

It has been suggested that Augustus was responsible for establishing the small cavalry contingent of 120 horse attached to each legion. The existence of this unit is attested in Josephus' Bellum Iudaicum written after AD 70, and on a number of tombstones. The attribution to Augustus is based on the (unproven) assumption that legionary cavalry had completely disappeared in the Caesarian army. The Augustan era also saw the introduction of some items of more sophisticated and protective equipment for legionaries, primarily to improve their survival rate. The lorica segmentata (normally called simply "the lorica" by the Romans), was a special laminated-strip body-armour, was probably developed under Augustus. Its earliest depiction is on the Arch of Augustus at Susa (Western Alps), dating from 6 BC. The oval shield of the Republic was replaced by the convex rectangular shield (scutum) of the imperial era.

==== Auxilia ====
Augustus' ambitious expansion plans for the Empire (which included advancing the European border to the lines of the Elbe and Danube rivers) soon proved that 28 legions were not sufficient. Starting with the Cantabrian Wars, which aimed to annex the mineral-rich mountains of north-western Spain, Augustus' 41-year sole rule saw an almost uninterrupted series of major wars that frequently stretched the army's manpower to the limit.

Augustus retained the services of numerous units of irregular allied native troops. But there was an urgent need for extra regular troops, organised, if not yet equipped, in the same way as the legions. These could only be drawn from the Empire's vast pool of non-citizen subjects, known as peregrini. These outnumbered Roman citizens by around nine to one in the early 1st century. The peregrini were now recruited into regular units of cohort-strength (c. 500 men), to form a non-citizen corps called the auxilia (literally: "supports"). By AD 23, Tacitus reports that the auxilia numbered roughly as many as the legionaries (i.e., c. 175,000 men). The roughly 250 regiments of auxilia this implies were divided into three types: an all-infantry cohors (plural: cohortes) (cohort) (c. 120 regiments); an infantry unit with a cavalry contingent attached, the cohors equitata (plural: cohortes equitatae) (80 units); and an all-cavalry ala (plural: alae, literal meaning: "wing"), of which c. 50 were originally established.

It appears that at this early stage, auxiliary recruitment was ethnically based, with most men originating from the same tribe or province. Hence regiments carried an ethnic name e.g., cohors V Raetorum ("5th Cohort of Raeti"), recruited from the Raeti, a group of Alpine tribes that inhabited modern Switzerland. It has been suggested that the equipment of auxiliary regiments was not standardised until after AD 50, and that until then, auxiliaries were armed with the traditional weaponry of their tribe. But it is possible that at least some regiments had standardised equipment from Augustan times.

Auxiliary regiments were designed to operate as a complement to the legions. That is, they performed exactly the same role as the Republic's alae of Italian allies (socii) before the Social War (91–88 BC), an equal number of which always accompanied legions on campaign.

==== Praetorian Guard ====
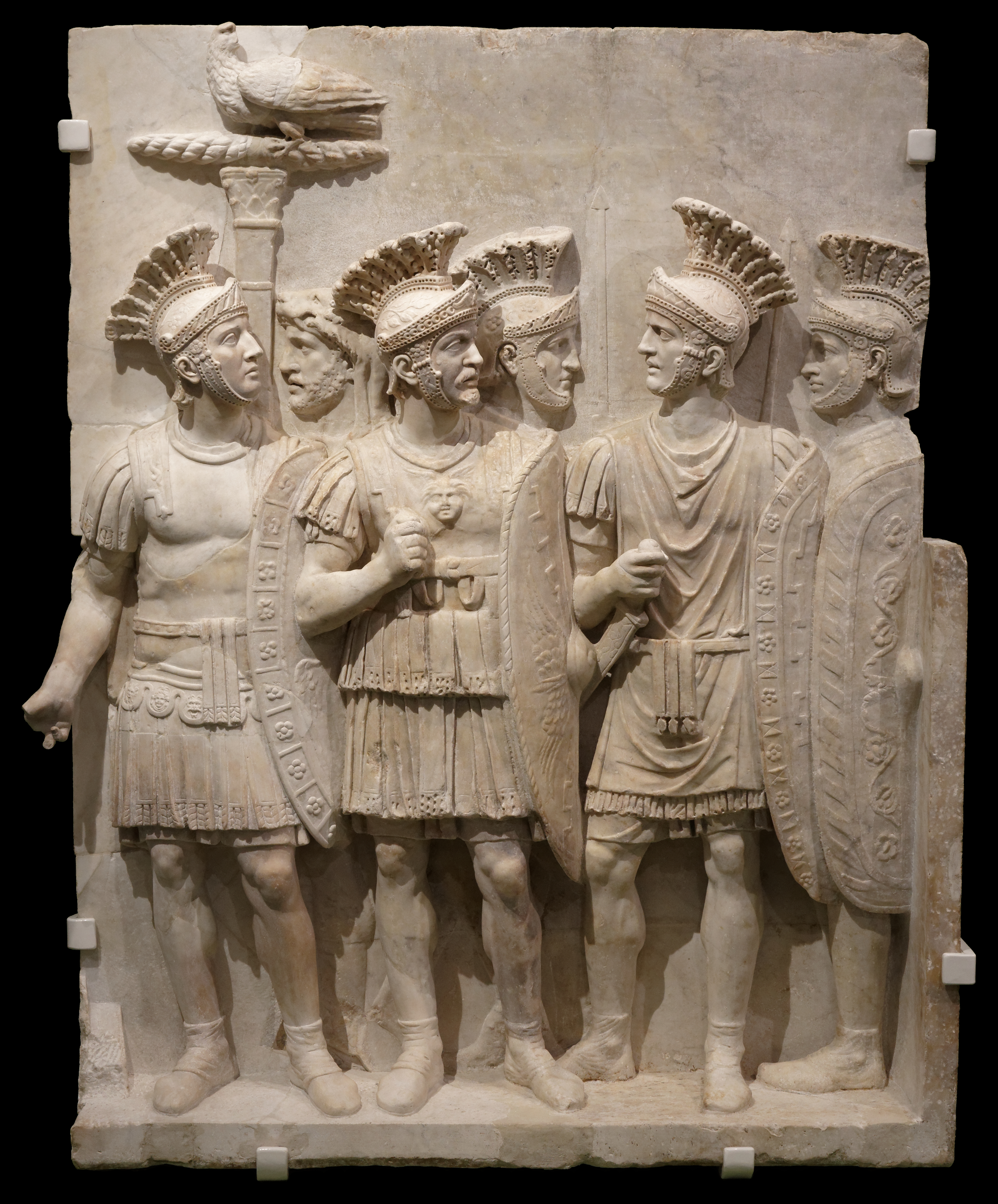
The Praetorians Relief, from the Arch of Claudius, Rome

Under the late Republic, a proconsul on campaign often formed a small personal guard, selected from the troops under his command, known as a cohors praetoria ("commander's cohort"), from praetorium meaning the commander's tent at the centre of a Roman marching-camp (or commander's residence in a legionary fortress). At the Battle of Actium (31 BC), Augustus had five such cohorts around him. After the battle, he retained them in being as a permanent brigade in and around Rome, known as the praetoriani ("soldiers of the imperial palace"). Inscription evidence suggests that Augustus increased the Praetorian establishment to nine cohorts, each under the command of a tribunus militum (military tribune). With all the legions deployed in far-off provinces under the command of powerful senators, Augustus evidently considered that he needed a least one legion-sized force with him in Rome to deter potential usurpers. Augustus stationed three cohorts in the City itself, each housed in separate barracks, and the rest in neighbouring cities of Latium. Originally, each cohort was independent, but in 2 BC, Augustus appointed two overall commanders (praefecti praetorio) of equestrian rank, one for the cohorts based in the City, the other for those outside.

Augustus envisaged the Praetorians as an elite force, whose duties included guarding the imperial palace on the Palatine Hill, protecting the Emperor's person and those of his family, defending the imperial government, and accompanying the emperor when he left the City on long journeys or to lead military campaigns in person. They also served as ceremonial troops on state occasions. Recruits to the ranks were, during the Julio-Claudian era, exclusively Italian-born. They were accorded much better pay and conditions than ordinary legionaries. In AD 5, the standard term of service for Praetorians was set at 16 years (compared to 25 years in the legions), and their pay was set at triple the rate of ordinary legionaries. In deference to Republican tradition, which banned armed men within the boundaries of the City of Rome, Augustus laid down a rule that Praetorians on duty within the City must not wear armour and must keep their weapons out of sight. Those Praetorians on important official duties, such as the Emperor's bodyguard-detail, wore the formal dress of Roman citizens, the toga, under which they concealed their swords and daggers. The rest wore the soldier's standard non-combat dress of tunic and cloak (paludamentum).

==== Urban cohorts ====
In addition to the Praetorians, Augustus established a second armed force in Rome, the cohortes urbanae ("urban cohorts"), of which three were based in the City and one in Lugdunum (Lyon) in Gaul, to protect the major imperial mint there. These battalions were tasked with maintaining public order in the City, including crowd-control at major events such as chariot-races and gladiatorial combats, and the suppression of the popular unrest that periodically shook the City, e.g., the riots caused by high grain prices in AD 19. Their command was given to the praefectus urbi, a senator who acted as Rome's "mayor". Unlike the praetorians, the urban cohorts were not deployed for military operations outside Italy.

==== Vigiles ====
The Vigiles or more properly the Vigiles Urbani ("watchmen of the City") or Cohortes Vigilum ("cohorts of the watchmen") were the firefighters and police of ancient Rome. The Vigiles also acted as a night watch, keeping an eye out for burglars and hunting down runaway slaves, and were on occasion used to maintain order in the streets. The Vigiles were considered a para-military unit and their organisation into cohorts and centuries reflects this.

==== Imperial German Bodyguard ====
To double-insure his own personal safety and that of imperial family members, Augustus established a small personal guard called the Germani corporis custodes (literally: "German bodyguards"). Probably of cohort-strength, these were crack horsemen recruited from native peoples on the lower Rhine, mainly from the Batavi. Their leader, probably a Batavi aristocrat, reported to the Emperor directly. The Germans shared the task of guarding the imperial family and the Palace with the Praetorians. In AD 68, the Emperor Galba disbanded the German Bodyguards because of their loyalty to Nero (r. 56–68 AD), whom he had overthrown. The decision caused deep offence to the Batavi, and contributed to the outbreak of the Revolt of the Batavi in the following year.

=== Principate ===
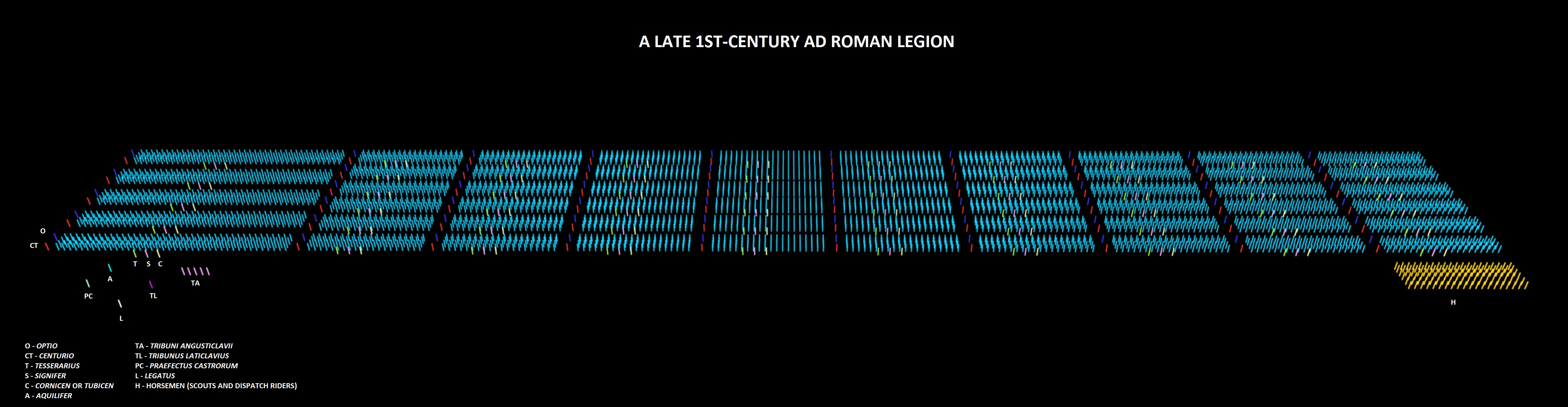
A diagram of a late 1st-century AD Roman legion.

The dual-structure configuration of legions/auxilia established by Augustus remained essentially intact until the late 3rd century, with only minor modifications made during that long period. The senior officers of the army were, until the 3rd century, mainly from the Italian aristocracy. This was divided into two orders, the senatorial order (ordo senatorius), consisting of the c. 600 sitting members of the Roman Senate (plus their sons and grandsons), and the more numerous (several thousand-strong) equites equo publico or "knights granted a public horse", i.e., knights hereditary or appointed by the Emperor. Hereditary senators and knights combined military service with civilian posts, a career-path known as the cursus honorum, typically starting with a period of junior administrative posts in Rome, followed by five to ten years in the military and a final period of senior positions in either the provinces or at Rome. This tiny, tightly knit ruling oligarchy of under 10,000 men monopolised political, military and economic power in an empire of c. 60 million inhabitants and achieved a remarkable degree of political stability. During the first 200 years of its existence (30 BC – AD 180), the empire suffered only one major episode of civil strife (the Civil War of 68–9). Otherwise, attempts at usurpation by provincial governors were few and swiftly suppressed.

Under the emperor Claudius (r. 41–54 AD), a minimum term of 25 years' service was established for auxiliary service (although many served for longer). On completion of the term, auxiliary soldiers, and their children, were from this time routinely granted Roman citizenship as a reward for service. (This is deduced from the fact that the first known Roman military diplomas date from the time of Claudius. This was a folding bronze tablet engraved with the details of the soldier's service record, which he could use to prove his citizenship). Claudius also decreed that prefects of auxiliary regiments must all be of knightly rank, thus excluding serving centurions from such commands. The fact that auxiliary commanders were now all of the same social rank as all but one of a legion's military tribunes, probably indicates that auxilia now enjoyed greater prestige. Indigenous chiefs continued to command some auxiliary regiments, and were normally granted the rank of Roman knight for the purpose. It is also likely that auxiliary pay was standardised at this time, but pay scales during the Julio-Claudian period are uncertain. Estimates range from 33 to 50% of legionary pay, well below the 75-80% in force in the time of the emperor Domitian (ruled 81–96). Auxiliary uniform, armour, weapons and equipment were probably standardised by the end of the Julio-Claudian period (AD 68). Auxiliary equipment was broadly similar to that of the legions. By AD 68, there was little difference between most auxiliary infantry and their legionary counterparts in equipment, training and fighting capability.

After about AD 80, the centuriae of the First Cohort of each legion were doubled in size to 160 men, but the number of centuriae apparently reduced to five, thus reducing the legion's centurions from 60 to 59. The legion's effectives were thus increased to c. 5,240 men plus officers. In the same period, some auxiliary regiments, both alae and cohortes, were also doubled to so-called milliaria size (literally "1,000-strong", actually only 720 in milliary alae and 800 in cohortes). But only a minority of auxiliary regiments, about one in seven, were so enlarged.

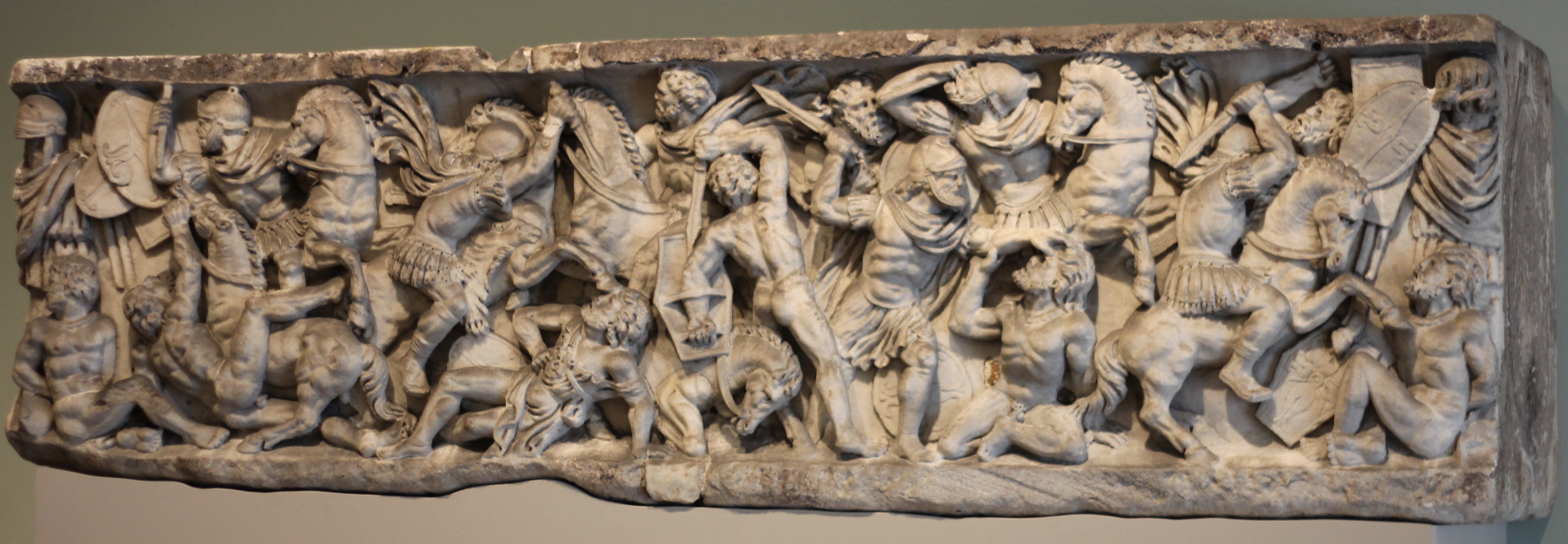
Roman and Celtic cavalry in combat. Roman sarcophagus, Dallas Museum of Art, c. 190 A.D.

During the 2nd century some units with the new names numerus ("group") and vexillatio ("detachment") appear in the diploma record. Their size is uncertain, but was likely smaller than the regular alae and cohortes, as originally they were probably detachments from the latter, acquiring independent status after long-term separation. As these units are mentioned in diplomas, they were presumably part of the regular auxiliary organisation. But numeri was also a generic term used for barbarian units outside the regular auxilia. (see section 2.4 Irregular units, below).

The traditional alternation between senior civilian and military posts fell into disuse in the late 2nd and 3rd centuries, as the Italian hereditary aristocracy was progressively replaced in the senior echelons of the army by the primipilares (former chief centurions). In the 3rd century, only 10% of auxiliary prefects whose origins are known were Italian equestrians, compared to the majority in the previous two centuries. At the same time, equestrians increasingly replaced the senatorial order in the top commands. Septimius Severus (r. 197–211 AD) placed equestrian primipilares in command of the three new legions he raised and Gallienus (r. 253–268 AD) did the same for all the other legions, giving them the title praefectus pro legato ("prefect acting as legate"). The rise of the primipilares may have provided the army with more professional leadership, but it increased military rebellions by ambitious generals. The 3rd century saw numerous coups d'état and civil wars. Few 3rd-century emperors enjoyed long reigns or died of natural causes.

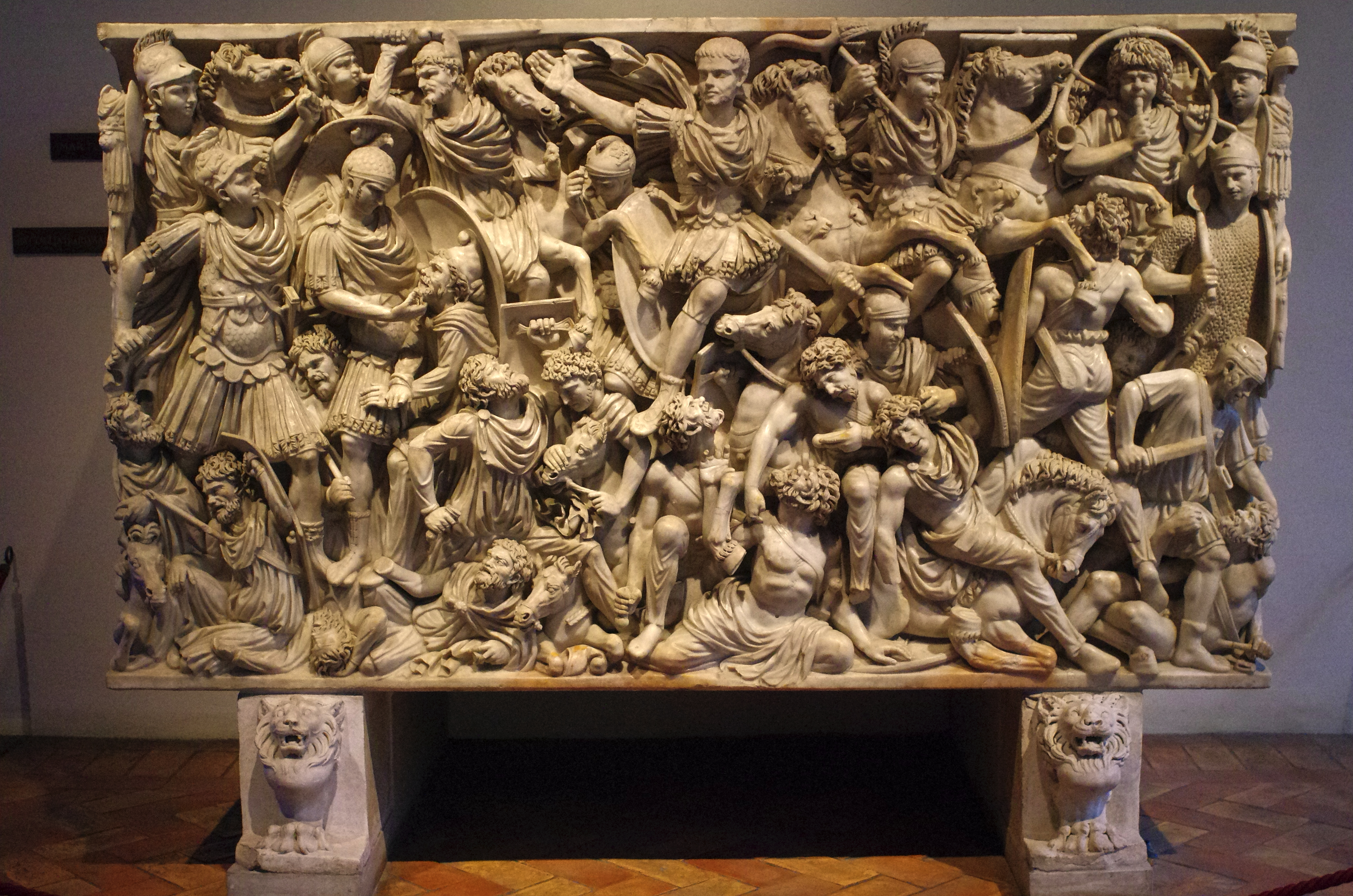
Relief from the Ludovisi Battle sarcophagus (250-260) depicting a battle between Romans and Germanic warriors; the central figure is perhaps the emperor Hostilian (d. 251)

Emperors responded to the increased insecurity with a steady build-up of the forces at their immediate disposal. These became known as the comitatus ("escort", from which derives the English word "committee"). To the Praetorian Guard's 10,000 men, Septimius Severus added the legion II Parthica. Based at Albano Laziale near Rome, it was the first legion to be stationed in Italy since Augustus. He doubled the size of the imperial escort cavalry, the equites singulares Augusti, to 2,000 by drawing select detachments from alae on the borders. His comitatus thus numbered some 17,000 men. The rule of Gallienus saw the appointment of a senior officer, with the title of dux equitum ("cavalry leader"), to command all the cavalry of the emperor's comitatus. This included equites promoti (cavalry contingents detached from the legions), plus Illyrian light cavalry (equites Dalmatarum) and allied barbarian cavalry (equites foederati). But the dux equitum did not command an independent "cavalry army", as was suggested by some more dated scholars. The cavalry remained integral to the mixed infantry- and cavalry-comitatus, with the infantry remaining the predominant element.

The seminal development for the army in the early 3rd century was the Constitutio Antoniniana (Antonine Decree) of 212, issued by Emperor Caracalla (r. 211–217 AD). This granted Roman citizenship to all free inhabitants of the empire, ending the second-class status of the peregrini. This had the effect of breaking down the distinction between the citizen legions and the auxiliary regiments. In the 1st and 2nd centuries, the legions were the symbol (and guarantors) of the dominance of the Italian "master nation" over its subject peoples. In the 3rd century, they were no longer socially superior to their auxiliary counterparts (although they may have retained their elite status in military terms).

In tandem, the legions' special armour and equipment (e.g., the lorica segmentata) was phased out during the early 3rd century. There was also a progressive reduction in the size of the legions. Legions were broken up into smaller units, as evidenced by the shrinkage and eventual abandonment of their traditional large bases, documented for example in Britain. In addition, from the 2nd century onwards, the separation of some detachments from their parent units became permanent in some cases, establishing new unit types, e.g., the vexillatio equitum Illyricorum based in Dacia in the early 2nd century and the equites promoti (legionary cavalry detached from their unit) and numerus Hnaufridi in Britain.

==== List of deployments ====
IMPERIAL ROMAN ARMY: Summary of known deployments c. AD 130
| Province | Approx. modern equivalent | Alae (no. mill.) | Cohortes (no. mill.) | Total aux. units | Auxiliary infantry | Auxiliary cavalry* | No. legions | Legionary infantry | Legionary cavalry | TOTAL GARRISON |
|---|---|---|---|---|---|---|---|---|---|---|
| Britannia | England/Wales | 11 (1) | 45 (6) | 56 | 25,520 | 10,688 | 3 | 16,500 | 360 | 53,068 |
Rhine Frontier
| Germania Inferior | S Neth/NW Rhineland | 6 | 17 | 23 | 8,160 | 4,512 | 2 | 11,000 | 240 | 23,912 |
| Germania Superior | Pfalz/Alsace | 3 | 22 (1) | 25 | 10,880 | 3,336 | 2 | 11,000 | 240 | 25,456 |
Danube Frontier
| Raetia/Noricum | S Ger/Switz/Austria | 7 (1) | 20 (5) | 27 | 11,220 | 5,280 | 1 | 5,500 | 120 | 22,120 |
| Pannonia (Inf + Sup) | W Hungary/Slovenia | 11 (2) | 21 (4) | 32 | 11,360 | 8,304 | 3 | 16,500 | 360 | 36,524 |
| Moesia Superior | Serbia | 2 | 10 | 12 | 4,800 | 1,864 | 2 | 11,000 | 240 | 17,904 |
| Moesia Inferior | N Bulgaria/coastal Rom | 5 | 12 | 17 | 5,760 | 3,520 | 3 | 16,500 | 120 | 25,780 |
| Dacia (Inf/Sup/Poroliss) | Romania | 11 (1) | 32 (8) | 43 | 17,920 | 7,328 | 2 | 11,000 | 240 | 36,488 |
Eastern Frontier
| Cappadocia | Central/East Turkey | 4 | 15 (2) | 19 | 7,840 | 3,368 | 3 | 16,500 | 360 | 28,068 |
| Syria (inc Judaea/Arabia) | Syria/Leb/Palest/ Jordan/Israel | 12 (1) | 43 (3) | 55 | 21,600 | 10,240 | 5 | 27,500 | 600 | 59,940 |
North Africa
| Aegyptus | Egypt | 4 | 11 | 15 | 5,280 | 3,008 | 2 | 11,000 | 240 | 19,528 |
| Mauretania (inc Africa) | Tunisia/Algeria/Morocco | 10 (1) | 30 (1) | 40 | 14,720 | 7,796 | 1 | 5,500 | 120 | 28,136 |
| Internal provinces | | 2 | 15 | 17 | 7,200 | 2,224 | 1 | 5,500 | 120 | 15,044 |
| TOTAL EMPIRE | | 88 (7) | 293 (30) | 381 | 152,260 | 71,468 | 30 | 165,000 | 3,600 | 392,328 |

Notes: (1) Table excludes c. 4,000 officers (centurions and above). (2) Auxiliary cavalry nos. assumes 70% of cohortes were equitatae

Roman Empire during Hadrian's reign

1. The table shows the importance of auxiliary troops in the 2nd century, when they outnumbered legionaries by 1.5 to 1.
2. The table shows that legions did not have a standard complement of auxiliary regiments and that there was no fixed ratio of auxiliary regiments to legions in each province. The ratio varied from six regiments per legion in Cappadocia to 40 per legion in Mauretania.
3. Overall, cavalry represented about 20% (including the small contingents of legionary cavalry) of the total army effectives. But there were variations: in Mauretania the cavalry proportion was 28%.
4. The figures show the massive deployments in Britannia and Dacia. Together, these two provinces account for 27% of the total auxilia corps.

== Units ==
=== Praetorian Guard ===
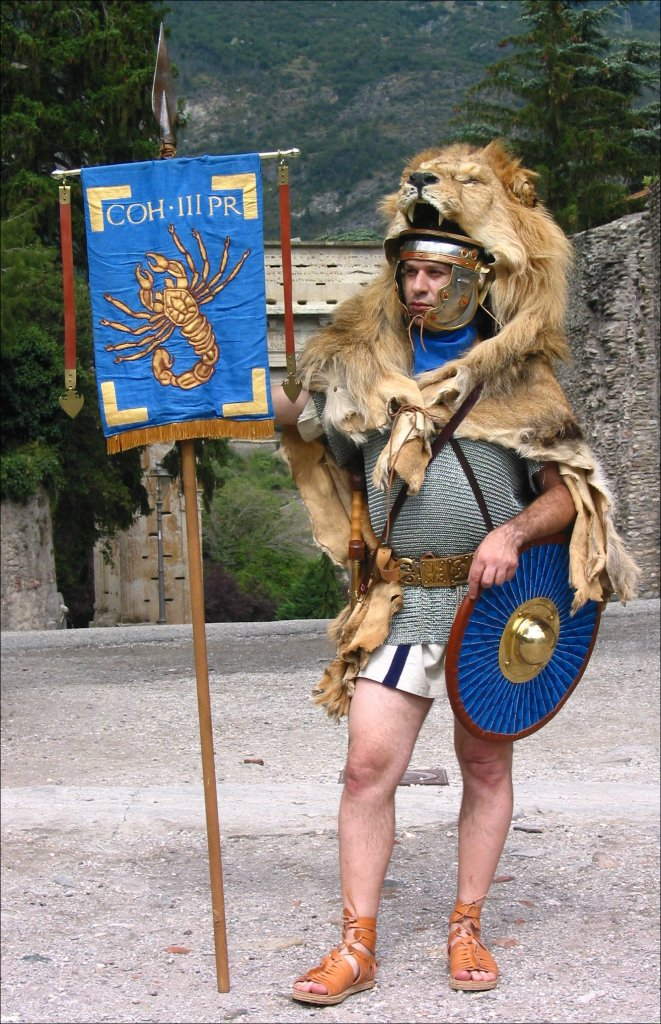
A reenactor dressed as a Praetorian vexillarius, the standard-bearer of the vexillum

Augustus' successor Tiberius (r. 14–37 AD), appointed only single commanders for the Praetorian Guard: Sejanus (14–31) and, after ordering the latter's execution for treason, Macro. Under the influence of Sejanus, who also acted as his chief political advisor, Tiberius decided to concentrate the accommodation of all the Praetorian cohorts into a single, purpose-built fortress of massive size on the outskirts of Rome, beyond the Servian Wall. Known as the castra praetoria ("praetorian camp"), its construction was complete by AD 23. After Tiberius, the number of prefects in office simultaneously was normally two, but occasionally only one or even three.

By AD 23, there were nine Praetorian cohorts in existence. These were probably the same size as legionary cohorts (480 men each), for a total of 4,320 effectives. Each cohort was under the command of a military tribune, normally a former chief centurion of a legion. It appears that each cohort contained some ninety cavalrymen who, like legionary cavalry were members of infantry centuriae, but operated in the field as three turmae of thirty men each. The number of Praetorian cohorts were increased to twelve by the time of Claudius. During the 68-9 civil war, Vitellius disbanded the existing cohorts because he did not trust their loyalty and recruited 16 new ones, all double-strength (i.e., containing 800 men each). However, Vespasian (r. 69–79 AD) reduced the number of cohorts back to the original nine (but still 800-strong), later increased to ten by his son, Domitian (r. 81–96 AD). By this time, therefore, the Guard consisted of c. 8,000 men.

It was probably Trajan (r. 98–117 AD) who established a separate cavalry arm of the Guard, the equites singulares Augusti ("personal cavalry of the emperor", or imperial horseguards). An elite troop recruited from members of the finest auxiliary alae (originally from Batavi alae only), the singulares were tasked with escorting the emperor on campaign. The unit was organised as a milliary ala, probably containing 720 horsemen. It was under the command of a military tribune, who probably reported to one of the Praetorian prefects. It was the only praetorian regiment that admitted persons who were not natural-born citizens, although recruits appear to have been granted citizenship on enlistment and not on completion of 25 years' service as for other auxiliaries. The unit was housed in its own barracks on the Caelian Hill, separate from the main castra praetoria. By the time of Hadrian (r. 117–138 AD), the singulares appear to have numbered 1,000 men. They were further expanded to 2,000 horse in the early 3rd century by Septimius Severus, who constructed a new, larger base for them in Rome, the castra nova equitum singularium. By AD 100, therefore, the Guard consisted of c. 9,000 effectives, rising to c. 10,000 under Severus.

Some historians have dismissed the Praetorian Guard as a parade-ground army of little military value. The Praetorians were certainly taunted as such by the soldiers of the Danubian legions during the civil war of 68–9. But Rankov argues that the Praetorians boasted a distinguished campaign-record that shows that their training and military effectiveness was far more impressive than those of merely ceremonial troops and amply justified their elite status. During the Julio-Claudian era (to 68), the Praetorians saw relatively little action in the field, as emperors only rarely led their armies in person. After that date, emperors led armies, and therefore deployed the Praetorians on campaign, much more frequently. The Praetorians were in the thick of the Emperor Domitian's wars, firstly in Germany and then on the Dacian front, where their prefect, Cornelius Fuscus was killed in action (87). Other examples include the Praetorians' prominent role in Trajan's Dacian Wars (101-6), as acknowledged on the friezes of Trajan's Column and the Adamklissi Tropaeum. Equally celebrated, on the Column of Marcus Aurelius, was the Praetorians' role in the Marcomannic Wars (166-80), in which two Guard prefects lost their lives. Even their final hour was wreathed in military glory: at the Battle of the Milvian Bridge (312), the Praetorians fought fiercely for their emperor Maxentius, trying to prevent the army of rival emperor Constantine I from crossing the river Tiber and entering Rome. Many perished fighting and others drowned when the makeshift pontoon-bridge they were using collapsed. Subsequently, the Praetorians paid the price of supporting the losing side: they were definitively disbanded, and their fortress demolished, by Constantine.

=== Legions ===
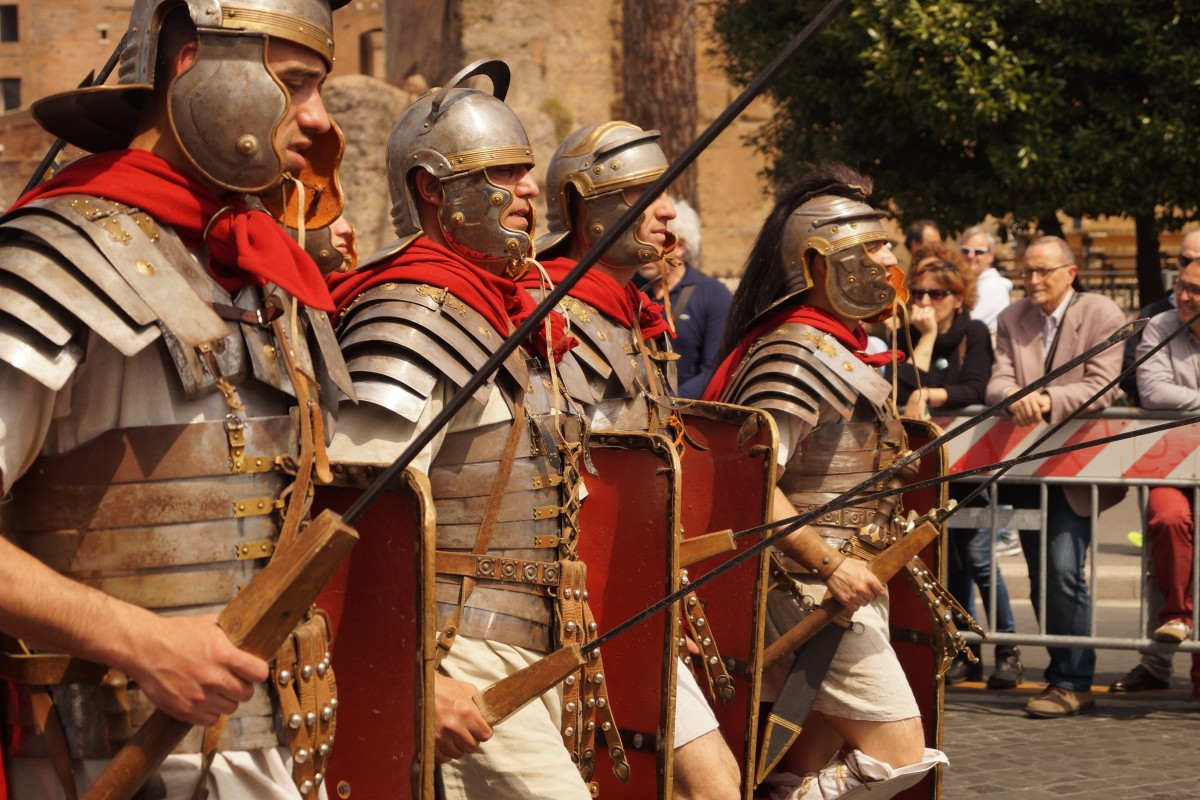
Depiction of Roman legionnaires

The legion consisted almost entirely of heavy infantry, i.e., infantry equipped with metal armour (helmets and cuirasses). Although it was almost unbeatable by non-Roman infantry on the battlefield, it was a large, inflexible unit that could not campaign independently due to the lack of cavalry cover and other specialist forces. It was dependent on the support of auxiliary regiments.

The legion's basic sub-unit was the centuria (plural: centuriae), which literally means "a hundred men", but in practice numbered 80 men in the Principate, equivalent in numbers to half of a modern company. The legion's main tactical sub-unit was the cohors (plural: cohortes, or cohort), which contained six centuriae for a total of 480 men, roughly the same size as a modern battalion. There were 10 cohorts to each legion, or 4,800 men (c. 5,000 including the small legionary cavalry of 120 horse and officers). Thus, a legion was equivalent in numbers to a modern brigade. By AD 100, however, the legion's First Cohort was divided into only five centuriae, but double-strength at 160 men each, for a total of 800 men. At this point, therefore, a legion would have numbered c. 5,300 effectives.

In addition, each legion contained a small cavalry contingent of 120 men. Unlike auxiliary cavalry, however, they do not appear to have been organised in separate cavalry squadrons (turmae) as were auxiliary cavalry, but to have been divided among specific centuriae. Legionary cavalry probably performed a non-combat role as messengers, scouts and escorts for senior officers.

=== Regular auxiliary units ===
The following table sets out the official, or establishment, strength of auxiliary units in the 2nd century. The real strength of a unit would fluctuate continually, but would likely have been somewhat less than the establishment most of the time.

ROMAN AUXILIARY REGIMENTS: TYPE, STRUCTURE AND STRENGTH
| Unit type | Service | Unit commander | Sub-unit commander | No of sub-units | Sub-unit strength | Unit strength |
|---|---|---|---|---|---|---|
| Ala quingenaria | cavalry | praefectus | decurio | 16 turmae | 30 (32)^{1} | 480 (512) |
| Ala milliaria | cavalry | praefectus | decurio | 24 turmae | 30 (32) | 720 (768) |
| Cohors quingenaria | infantry | praefectus^{2} | centurio | 6 centuriae | 80 | 480 |
| Cohors milliaria | infantry | tribunus militum^{3} | centurio | 10 centuriae | 80 | 800 |
| Cohors equitata quingenaria | infantry plus cavalry contingent | praefectus | centurio (inf) decurio (cav) | 6 centuriae 4 turmae | 80; 30. | 600 (480 inf/120 cav) |
| Cohors equitata milliaria | infantry plus cavalry contingent | tribunus militum^{3} | centurio (inf) decurio (cav) | 10 centuriae 8 turmae | 80; 30 | 1,040 (800 inf/240 cav) |

Notes

(1) Opinion is divided about the size of an ala turma, between 30 and 32 men. A turma numbered 30 in the Republican cavalry and in the cohors equitata of the Principate auxilia. Against this is a statement by Arrian that an ala was 512 strong. This would make an ala turma 32 men strong.
(2) tribunus militum in original citizen cohortes
(3) praefectus in Batavi and Tungri cohortes milliariae

Unless the regiment name was qualified by a specialist function e.g. cohors sagittariorum ("cohort of archers"), its infantry and cavalry were heavily equipped in the same way as the legionaries.

==== Cohors ====
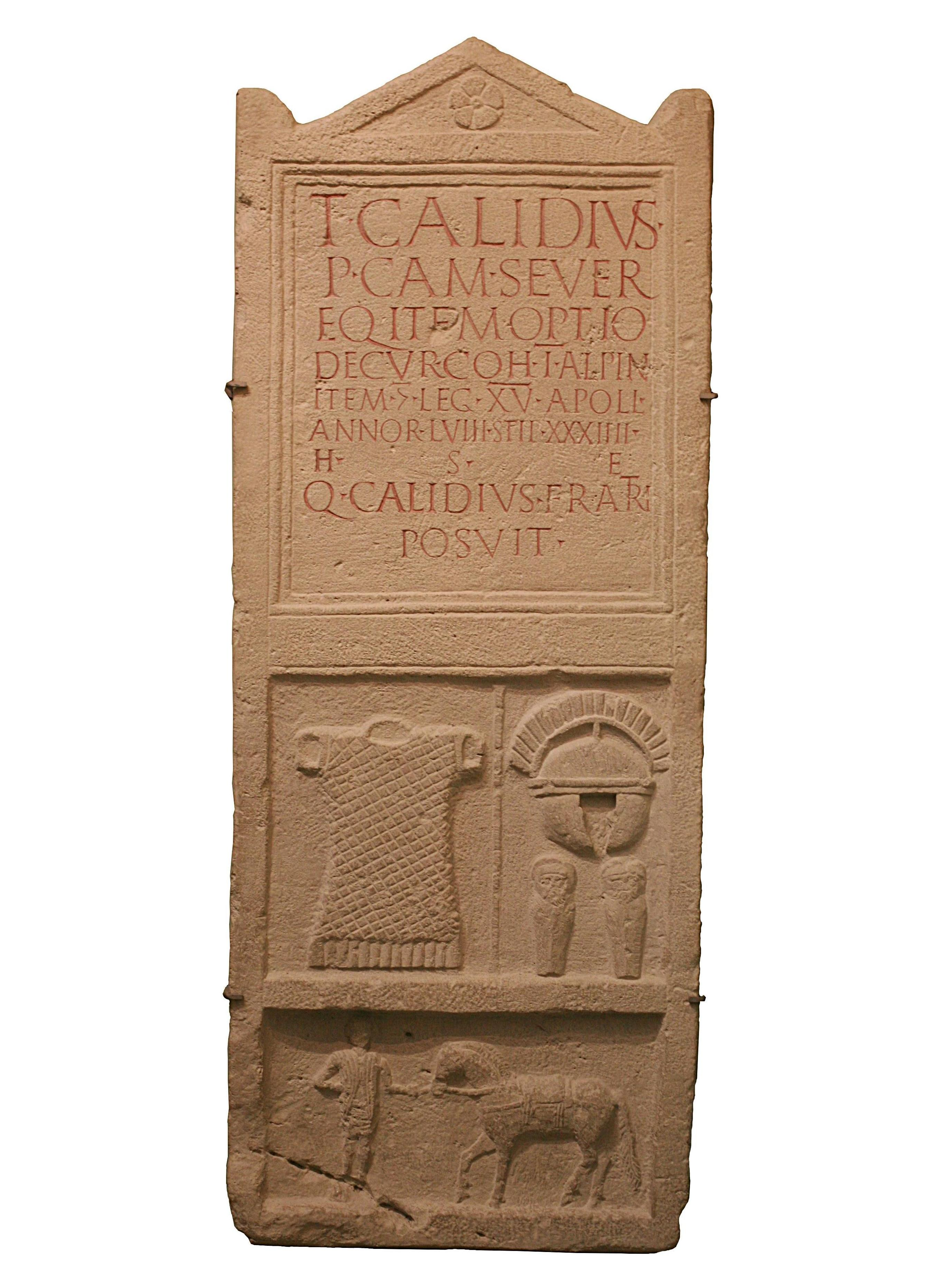
Tombstone of Titus Calidius Severus, an auxiliary trooper who worked his way up from eques (common cavalryman) to optio of the Cohors I Alpinorum (a mixed infantry/cavalry regiment from the western Alps). He then switched to a legion (presumably after gaining Roman citizenship after 25 of his 34 years of service) and became a centurion in the cavalry arm of Legio XV Apollinaris. He died at age 58, probably shortly after his discharge. Note the portrayal of his chain-mail armour, centurion's transversal crested helmet and horse, led by his equerry, probably a slave. Dates from ante 117, when XV Apollinaris was transferred from Carnuntum (Austria) to the East.

These all-infantry units were modeled on the cohorts of the legions, with the same officers and sub-units. It is a common misconception that auxiliary cohortes contained light infantry: this only applies to specialist units such as archers. Their defensive equipment of regular auxiliary infantry was very similar to that of legionaries, consisting of metal helmet and metal cuirass (chain-mail or scale). There is no evidence that auxiliaries were equipped with the lorica segmentata, the elaborate and expensive laminated-strip body-armour that was issued to legionaries. However, legionaries often wore chain-mail and scalar cuirasses also. In addition, it appears that auxiliaries carried a round shield (clipeus) instead of the curved rectangular shield (scutum) of legionaries. As regards weapons, auxiliaries were equipped in the same way as legionaries: a javelin (although not the sophisticated pilum type provided to legionaries), a gladius (short stabbing-sword) and pugio (dagger). It has been estimated that the total weight of auxiliary infantry equipment was similar to that of legionaries', so that non-specialist cohortes may also be classified as heavy infantry, which fought in the battle-line alongside legionaries.

There is no evidence that auxiliary infantry fought in a looser order than legionaries. It appears that in a set-piece battle-line, auxiliary infantry would normally be stationed on the flanks, with legionary infantry holding the centre, e.g., as in the Battle of Watling Street (AD 60), the final defeat of the rebel Britons under queen Boudicca. This was a tradition inherited from the Republic, when the precursors of auxiliary cohortes, the Latin alae, occupied the same position in the line. The flanks of the line required equal, if not greater, skill to hold as the centre.

==== Ala ====
The all-mounted alae contained the elite cavalry of the Roman army. They were specially trained in elaborate manoeuvres, such as those displayed to the emperor Hadrian during a documented inspection. They were best-suited for large-scale operations and battle, during which they acted as the primary cavalry escort for the legions, which had almost no cavalry of their own. They were heavily protected, with chain-mail or scale body armour, a cavalry version of the infantry helmet (with more protective features) and oval shield. Their offensive weapons included a spear (hasta), a cavalry sword (spatha), which was much longer than the infantry gladius to provide greater reach and a long dagger. The elite status of an alaris is shown by the fact that he received 20% greater pay than his counterpart in a cohort, and than a legionary infantryman.

==== Cohors equitata ====
These were cohortes with a cavalry contingent attached. There is evidence that their numbers expanded with the passage of time. Only about 40% of attested cohortes are specifically attested as equitatae in inscriptions, which is probably the original Augustan proportion. A study of units stationed in Syria in the mid 2nd century found that many units which did not carry the equitata title did in fact contain cavalrymen e.g., by discovery of a tombstone of a cavalryman attached to the cohort. This implies that by that time, at least 70% of cohortes were probably equitatae. The addition of cavalry to a cohort obviously enabled it to carry out a wider range of independent operations. A cohors equitata was in effect a self-contained mini-army.

The traditional view of equites cohortales (the cavalry arm of cohortes equitatae), as expounded by G.L. Cheesman, was that they were just a mounted infantry with poor-quality horses. They would use their mounts simply to reach the battlefield and then would dismount to fight. This view is today discredited. Although it is clear that equites cohortales did not match equites alares (ala cavalrymen) in quality (hence their lower pay), the evidence is that they fought as cavalry in the same way as the alares and often alongside them. Their armour and weapons were the same as for the alares.

Nevertheless, non-combat roles of the equites cohortales differed significantly from the alares. Non-combat roles such as despatch-riders (dispositi) were generally filled by cohort cavalry.

=== Specialised auxiliary units ===
==== Heavily armoured lancers ====
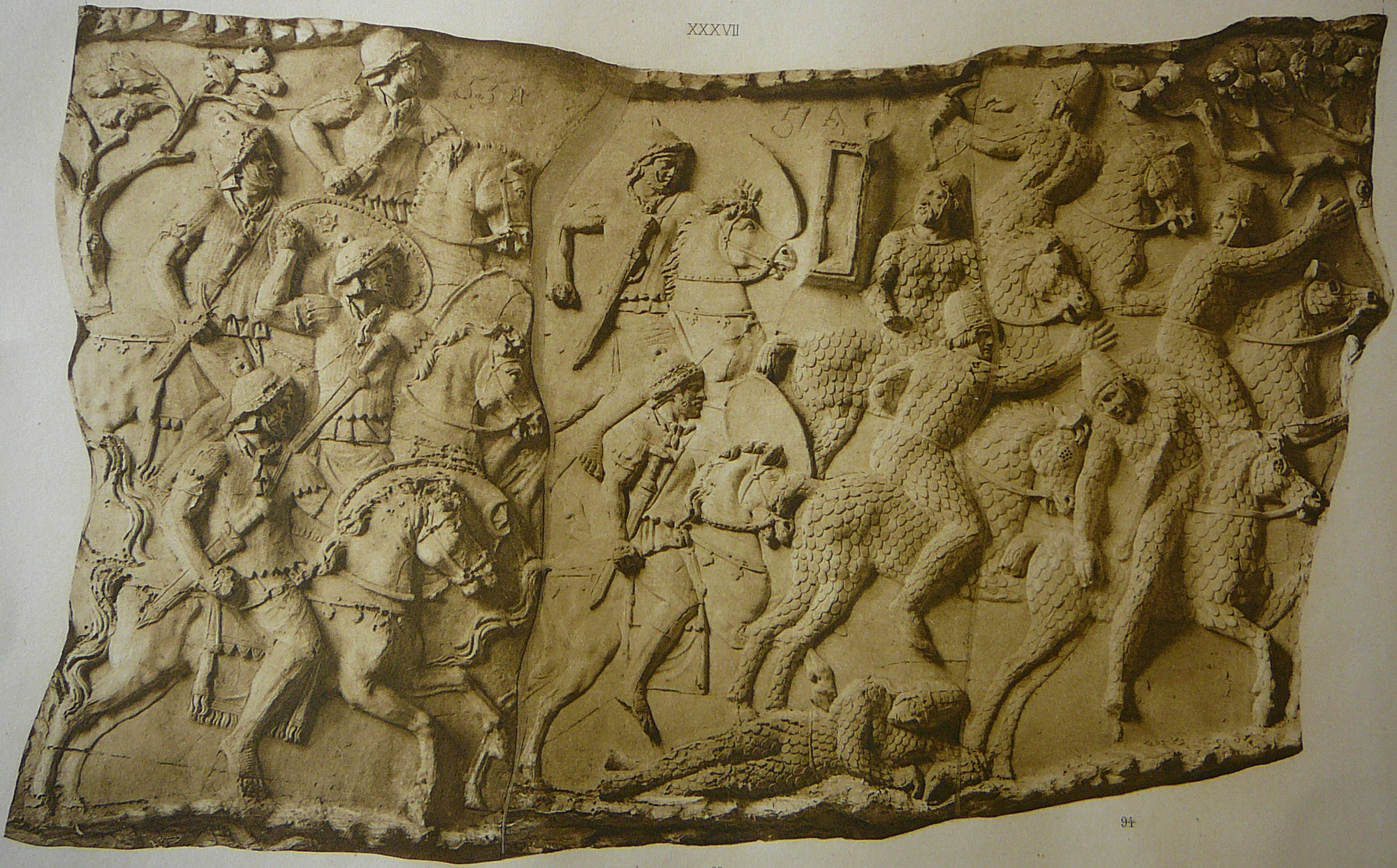
Routed Sarmatian cataphracts (right), allied to the Dacian king Decebalus, flee from charging Roman alares (auxiliary cavalrymen), during the Dacian Wars (AD 101–6). Note the Sarmatians' full-body scalar armour, also armoured caparison for horses (including eye-guards). The Sarmatians' lances (as well as the Romans') have disappeared due to stone erosion, but a sword is still visible, as is a bow carried by one man. Panel from Trajan's Column, Rome

Equites cataphractarii, or simply cataphractarii for short, were the heavily armoured cavalry of the Roman army. Based on Sarmatian and Parthian models, they were also known as contarii and clibanarii, although it is unclear whether these terms were interchangeable or whether they denoted variations in equipment or role. Their common feature was scalar armour which covered the whole body and conical helmets. Their lances (contus) were very long and were held in both hands, precluding the use of shields. In some cases, their horses are also depicted as protected by scalar armour, including head-piece. Normally, they were also equipped with long swords. In some cases, they carried bows instead of lances.

Together with new units of light mounted archers, the cataphractarii were designed to counter Parthian (and, in Pannonia, Sarmatian) battle-tactics. Parthian armies consisted largely of cavalry. Their standard tactic was to use light mounted archers to weaken and break up the Roman infantry line, and then to rout it with a charge by the cataphractarii concentrated on the weakest point. The only special heavy cavalry units to appear in the 2nd century record are: ala Ulpia contariorum and ala I Gallorum et Pannoniorum cataphractaria stationed in Pannonia and Moesia Inferior respectively in the 2nd century. Both faced the so-called "Sarmatian salient" between the Roman territories of Pannonia and Dacia, i.e., the Hungarian Plain, the territory of the Iazyges, a Sarmatian tribe which had migrated there and seized control of it during the 1st century.

==== Light cavalry ====
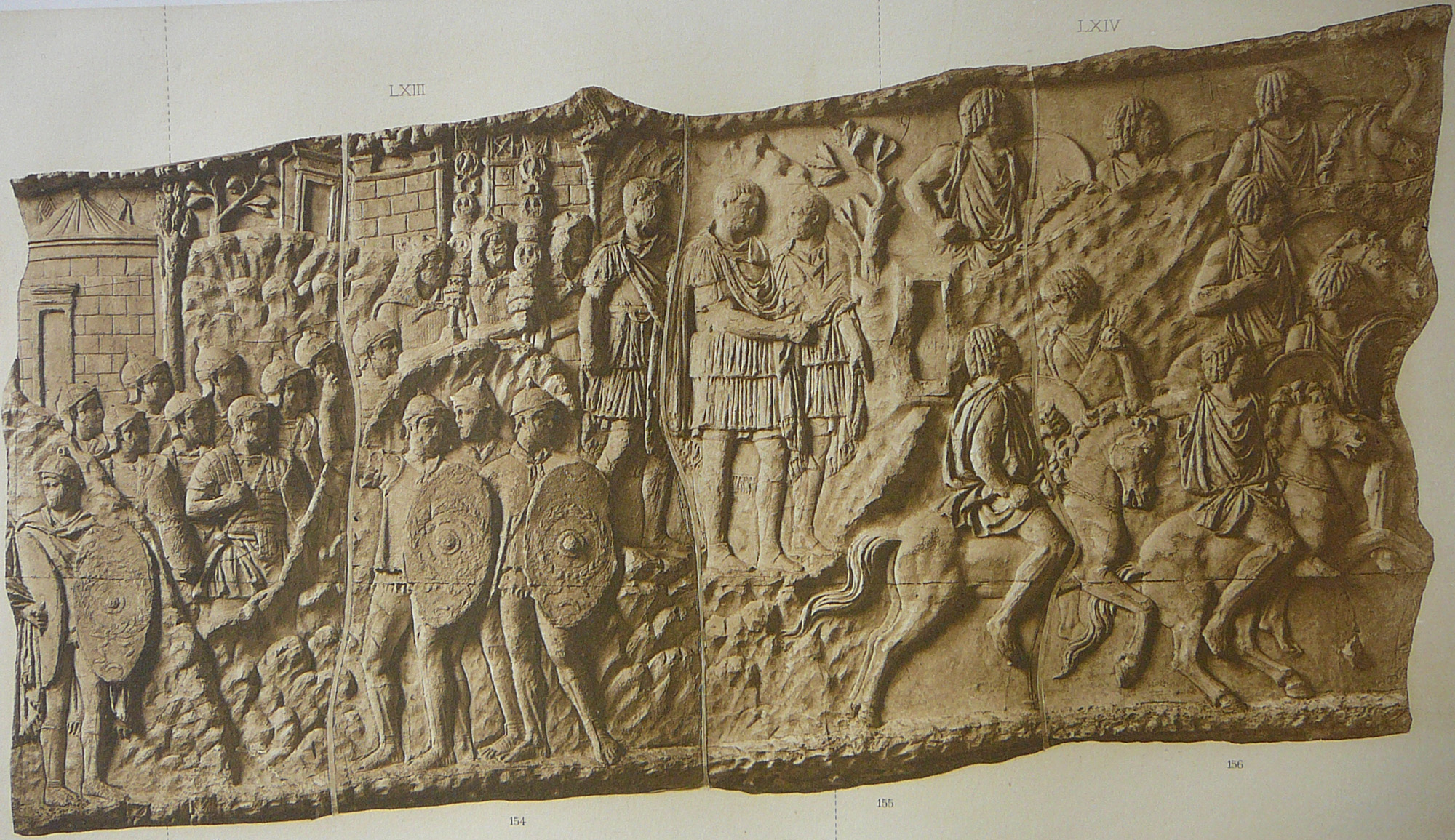
Numidian light cavalry (equites Numidae) deployed in the conquest of Dacia (right). As usual in a Roman advancing column, these light cavalrymen would be sent ahead of the main infantry to scout the way. Note the Numidians' dreadlocks, lack of armour, saddles or bridles. Detail from Trajan's Column, Rome

From the Second Punic War until the 3rd century AD, the bulk of Rome's light cavalry (apart from mounted archers from Syria) was provided by the inhabitants of the northwest African provinces of Africa proconsularis and Mauretania, the Numidae or Mauri (from whom derives the English term "Moors"), who were the ancestors of the Berber people of modern Algeria and Morocco. They were known as the equites Maurorum or Numidarum ("Moorish or Numidian cavalry"). On Trajan's Column, Mauri horsemen, depicted with long hair in dreadlocks, are shown riding their small but resilient horses bare-back and unbridled, with a simple braided rope round their mount's neck for control. They wear no body or head armour, carrying only a small, round leather shield. Their weaponry cannot be discerned due to stone erosion, but is known from Livy to have consisted of several short javelins. Exceptionally fast and maneuverable, Numidian cavalry would harass the enemy by hit-and-run attacks, riding up and loosing volleys of javelins, then scattering faster than any opposing cavalry could pursue. They were superbly suited to scouting, harassment, ambush and pursuit, but in melee combat were vulnerable to cuirassiers. It is unclear what proportion of the Numidian cavalry were regular auxilia units as opposed to irregular foederati units.

In the 3rd century, new formations of light cavalry appear, apparently recruited from the Danubian provinces: the equites Dalmatae ("Dalmatian cavalry"). Little is known about these, but they were prominent in the 4th century, with several units listed in the Notitia Dignitatum.

==== Camel troops ====
A unit of dromedarii ("camel-mounted troops") is attested from the 2nd century, the ala I Ulpia dromedariorum milliaria in Syria.

==== Archers ====
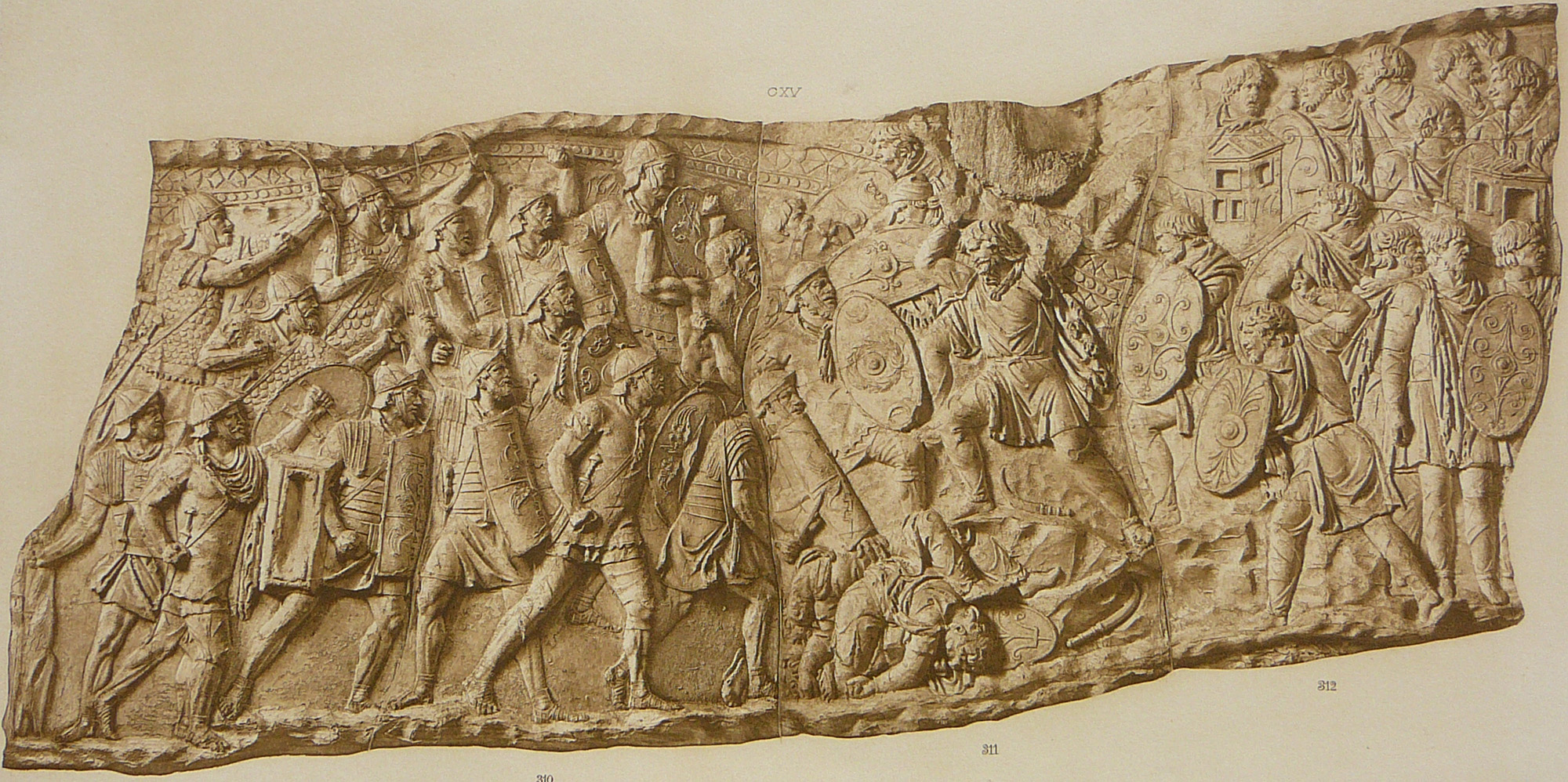
Roman archers (top left) in action, positioned as normal in battle behind their own infantry, loosing arrows over their heads. Note conical helmets, indicating a Syrian unit, and recurved bows. Trajan's Column, Rome

A substantial number of auxiliary regiments (32, or about one in twelve in the 2nd century) were denoted sagittariorum, or archer-units (from sagittarii lit. "arrow-men", from sagitta = "arrow": It. saetta, Rom. sageata). These 32 units (of which four were double-strength) had a total official strength of 17,600 men. All three types of auxiliary regiment (ala, cohors and cohors equitata) could be denoted sagittariorum. Although these units evidently specialised in archery, it is uncertain from the available evidence whether all sagittariorum personnel were archers, or simply a higher proportion than in ordinary units. At the same time, ordinary regiments probably also possessed some archers, otherwise their capacity for independent operations would have been unduly constrained. Bas-reliefs appear to show personnel in ordinary units employing bows.

From about 218 BC onwards, the archers of the Roman army of the mid-Republic were virtually all mercenaries from the island of Crete, which boasted a long specialist tradition. During the late Republic (88–30 BC) and the Augustan period, Crete was gradually eclipsed by men from other, much more populous, regions with strong archery traditions, newly subjugated by the Romans. These included Thrace, Anatolia and above all, Syria. Of the thirty-two sagittarii units attested in the mid 2nd century, thirteen have Syrian names, seven Thracian, five from Anatolia, one from Crete and the remaining six of other or uncertain origin.

Three distinct types of archers are shown on Trajan's Column: (a) with scalar cuirass, conical steel helmet and cloak; (b) without armour, with cloth conical cap and long tunic; or (c) equipped in the same way as general auxiliary foot-soldiers (apart from carrying bows instead of javelins). The first type were probably Syrian or Anatolian units; the third type probably Thracian. The standard bow used by Roman auxilia was the recurved composite bow, a sophisticated, compact and powerful weapon.

==== Slingers ====
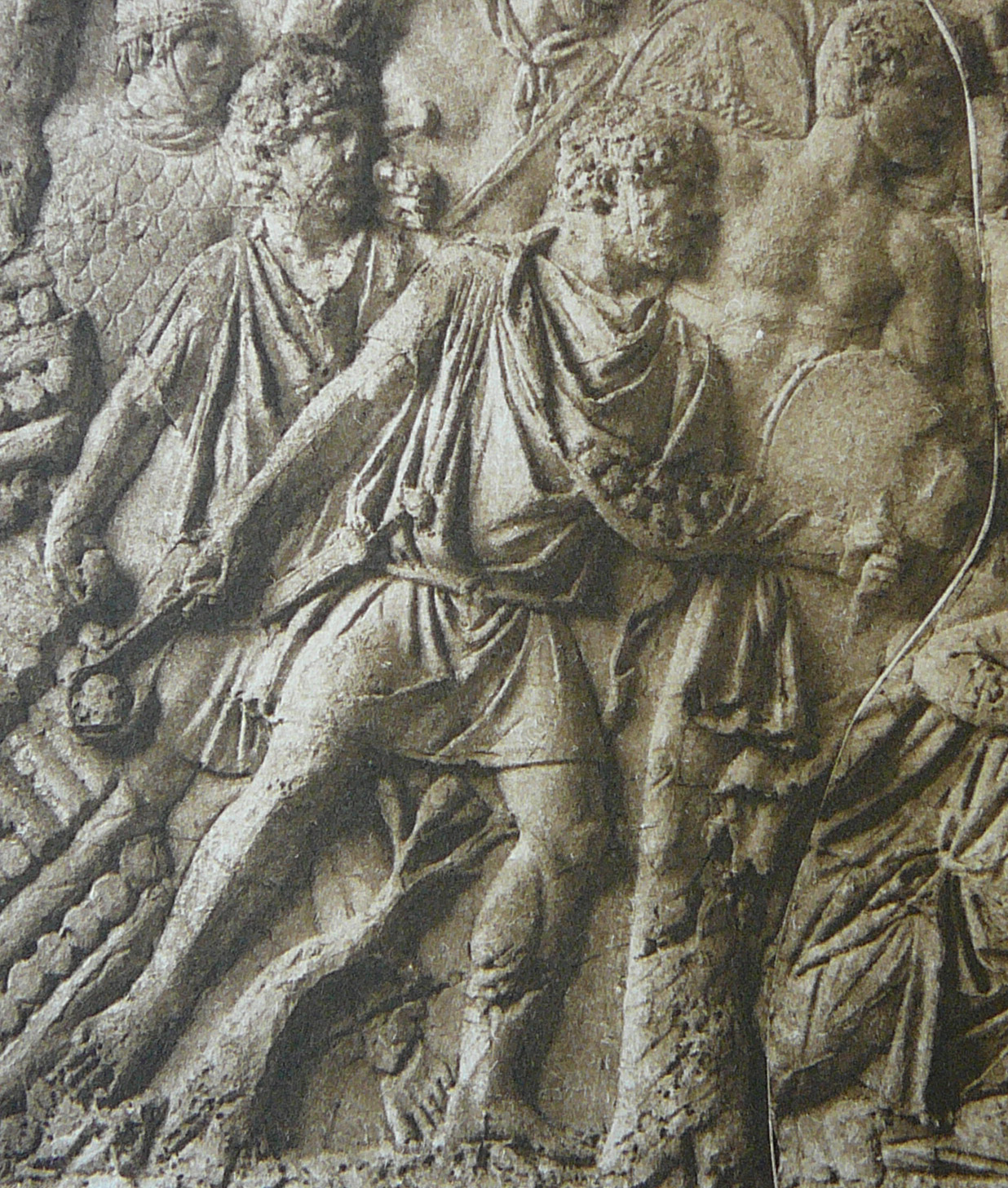
Roman slingers (funditores) in action in the Dacian Wars. Detail from Trajan's Column, Rome

From about 218 BC onwards, the Republican army's slingers were exclusively mercenaries from the Balearic Islands, which had nurtured a strong indigenous tradition of slinging from prehistoric times. As a result, in classical Latin, Baleares (literally "inhabitants of the Balearic Islands") became an alternative word for "slingers" (funditores, from funda = "sling": It. fionda, Fr. fronde). Because of this, it is uncertain whether most of the imperial army's slingers continued to be drawn from the Balearics themselves, or, like archers, derived mainly from other regions.

Independent slinger units are not attested in the epigraphic record of the Principate. However, slingers are portrayed on Trajan's Column. They are shown unarmoured, wearing a short tunic. They carry a cloth bag, slung in front, to hold their shot (glandes).

==== Scouts ====
Exploratores ("reconnaissance troops", from explorare = "to scout"): Examples include two numeri exploratorum attested in the 3rd century in Britain: Habitanco and Bremenio (both names of forts). Little is known about such units.

=== Allied forces ===
Throughout the Principate period, there is evidence of ethnic units of barbari outside the normal auxilia organisation fighting alongside Roman troops. To an extent, these units were simply a continuation of the old client-king levies of the late Republic: ad hoc bodies of troops supplied by Rome's puppet petty-kings on the imperial borders to assist the Romans in particular campaigns. Some units, however, remained in Roman service for substantial periods after the campaign for which they were raised, keeping their own native leadership, attire and equipment and structure. These units were variously called by the Romans socii ("allies"), symmachiarii (from symmachoi, Greek for "allies") or foederati ("treaty troops" from foedus, "treaty"). One estimate puts the number of foederati in the time of Trajan at c. 11,000, divided into c. 40 numeri (units) of c. 300 men each. The purpose of employing foederati units was to use their specialist fighting skills. Many of these would have been troops of Numidian cavalry (see light cavalry above).

The foederati make their first official appearance on Trajan's Column, where they are portrayed in a standardised manner, with long hair and beards, barefoot, stripped to the waist, wearing long trousers held up by wide belts and wielding clubs. In reality several different tribes supported the Romans in the Dacian wars. Their attire and weapons would have varied widely. The Column stereotypes them with the appearance of a single tribe, probably the most outlandish-looking, to differentiate them clearly from the regular auxilia. Judging by the frequency of their appearance in the Column's battle scenes, the foederati were important contributors to the Roman operations in Dacia. Another example of foederati are the 5,500 captured Sarmatian cavalrymen sent by Emperor Marcus Aurelius (r. 161–180 AD) to garrison a fort on Hadrian's Wall after their defeat in the Marcomannic Wars.

== Organization ==
As all-citizen formations and symbolic protectors of the dominance of the Italian "master-nation", legions enjoyed greater social prestige than the auxilia for much of the Principate. This was reflected in better pay and benefits. In addition, legionaries were equipped with more expensive and protective armour than auxiliaries, notably the lorica segmentata, or laminated-strip armour. However, in 212, the Emperor Caracalla granted Roman citizenship to nearly all the Empire's freeborn inhabitants. At this point, the distinction between legions and auxilia became moot, the latter becoming all-citizen units also. The change was reflected in the disappearance, during the 3rd century, of legionaries' special equipment, and the progressive break-up of legions into cohort-sized units like the auxilia.

The military chain of command was relatively flat. In each province, the deployed legions' legati (legion commanders, who also controlled the auxiliary units attached to their legion) reported to the legatus Augusti pro praetore (provincial governor), who also headed the civil administration. The governor in turn reported directly to the Emperor in Rome. There was no general staff in Rome, but the leading praefectus praetorio (commander of the Praetorian Guard) often acted as the Emperor's de facto military chief-of-staff.

Compared to the subsistence-level peasant families from which they mostly originated, legionary rankers enjoyed considerable disposable income, enhanced by periodical cash bonuses on special occasions such as the accession of a new emperor. In addition, on completion of their term of service, they were given a generous discharge bonus equivalent to 13 years' salary. Auxiliaries were paid much less in the early 1st century, but by 100 AD, the differential had virtually disappeared. Similarly, in the earlier period, auxiliaries appear not to have received cash and discharge bonuses, but probably did so from the reign of Hadrian onwards. Junior officers (principales), the equivalent of non-commissioned officers in modern armies, could expect to earn up to twice basic pay. Legionary centurions, the equivalent of senior warrant officers, were organised in an elaborate hierarchy. Usually promoted from the ranks, they commanded the legion's tactical sub-units of centuriae (about 80 men) and cohorts (about 480 men). They were paid several multiples of basic pay. The most senior centurion, the primus pilus, was automatically elevated to equestrian rank on completion of his single-year term of office. The senior officers of the army, the legati legionis (legion commanders), tribuni militum (legion staff officers) and the praefecti (commanders of auxiliary regiments) were all of at least equestrian rank. In the 1st and early 2nd centuries, they were mainly Italian aristocrats performing the military component of their cursus honorum (conventional career-path). Later, provincial career officers became predominant. Senior officers were paid enormous salaries, multiples of at least 50 times a soldier's basic pay.

Soldiers spent only a fraction of their lives on campaign. Most of their time was spent on routine military duties such as training, patrolling, and maintenance of equipment. Soldiers also played an important role outside the military sphere. They performed the function of a provincial governor's police force. As a large, disciplined and skilled force of fit men, they played a crucial role in the construction of a province's military and civil infrastructure. In addition to constructing forts and fortified defences such as Hadrian's Wall, they built roads, bridges, ports, public buildings and entire new cities (colonia), and cleared forests and drained marshes to expand a province's available arable land.

Soldiers, mostly drawn from polytheistic societies, enjoyed wide freedom of worship in the polytheistic Roman system. Only a few cults were banned by the Roman authorities, as being incompatible with the official Roman religion or being politically subversive, notably Druidism and Christianity. The later Principate saw the rise in popularity among the military of Eastern mystery cults, generally centred on one deity, and involving secret rituals divulged only to initiates. By far the most popular cult in the army was Mithraism, an apparently syncretist cult which mainly originated in Asia Minor.

=== Command structure ===
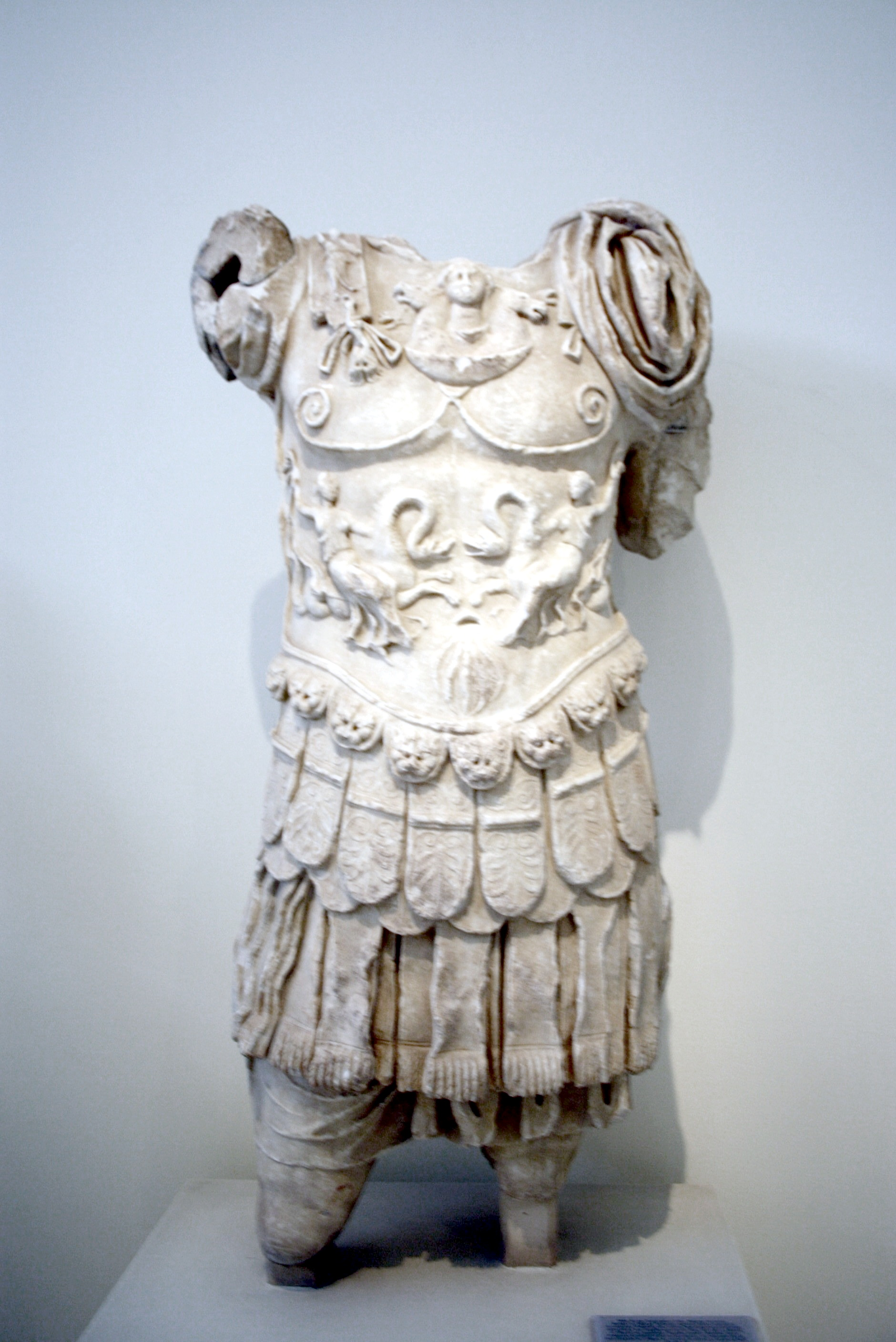
Ancient Roman statue fragment of either a general or an emperor wearing a corselet decorated with Selene, and two Nereids. Found at Megara, dating from 100 to 130 AD.

Under the Augustan settlement, the Roman Empire formally remained a republic and ultimate military authority was still vested in the consuls. However actual power resided with the governors – proconsuls or lower promagistrates – who were in charge of all military forces within their province. Hence August moved to secure "supreme proconsular authority" (imperium proconsulare maius) from the Senate, thereby subjecting the provincial governors to his command and becoming, in effect, commander-in-chief of the Roman army. In addition, the emperor frequently had himself elected as one of the Consuls or Censors. The latter post was especially useful, as it gave him the power to appoint (or remove) members from the roll of Senators and from the Order of Knights, the two aristocratic orders of imperial Rome, which filled all senior administrative and military positions.

In the border provinces where military units were mostly stationed (i.e. 15-17 of the 42 Hadrianic provinces), the governors mostly bore the title legatus Augusti pro praetore, although in a few smaller provinces they were known as procurator or praefectus. The governors, who normally held office for three years, commanded all forces in their provinces, both legions and auxilia, as well as being the heads of the civil administration. The governors reported directly to the emperor – there were no intermediate levels of command. However, there are instances during the Principate where the governors of smaller provinces were subordinated to governors of larger neighbouring ones e.g., the praefectus (later procurator) of Judaea was normally subordinate to the legatus Augusti of Syria.

At Rome, there was no army general staff in the modern sense of a permanent central group of senior staff-officers who would receive and analyse military intelligence and advise on strategy. Augustus established a formal consilium principis ("imperial council") of magistrates and leading senators in rotation to advise him on all state matters and to prepare draft-decrees for submission to the Senate. But the real decisions were made by a semi-formal group of senior officials and close friends, the amici principis ("friends of the emperor"), whose membership was chosen by himself and might vary from time to time. Under Tiberius, the amici superseded the formal consilium and became the effective governing body of the empire.

Several amici would have had extensive military experience, due to the traditional mixing of civilian and military posts by the Principate aristocracy. But there was no consilium specifically dedicated to military affairs. Commanders of the Praetorian Guard, especially if they did not share their command with a partner, might acquire a predominant influence in military decision-making and act as de facto military chief-of-staff e.g., Sejanus, who was sole commander of the Guard AD 14–31, most of the emperor Tiberius' rule.

The emperor and his advisors relied almost entirely on reports from the 17-odd "military" governors for their intelligence on the security situation on the imperial borders. This is because a central military intelligence agency was never established. The imperial government did develop an internal security unit called the frumentarii. In military jargon, this term, literally meaning "grain-collectors" (from frumentum = "grain"), referred to detachments of soldiers detailed to forage food supplies for their units in the field. The term came to be applied to auxiliary soldiers seconded to the staff of the procurator Augusti, the independent chief financial officer of a province, to assist in the collection of taxes (originally in kind as grain). At some point, probably under Hadrian (r. 117–38), the term acquired a very different meaning. A permanent military unit (numerus) of frumentarii was established. Based in Rome, it was under the command of a senior centurion, the princeps frumentariorum. According to Aurelius Victor, the frumentarii were set up "to investigate and report on potential rebellions in the provinces" (presumably by provincial governors) i.e. they performed the function of an imperial secret police (and became widely feared and detested as a result of their methods, which included assassination). Although doubtless well-informed about events in the border-provinces through their network of local agents and spies, it appears that the frumentarii never expanded beyond internal security to fulfil a systematic military intelligence role.

The lack of independent military intelligence, coupled with the slow speeds of communication, prevented the emperor and his consilium from exercising anything but the most general control over military operations in the provinces. Typically, a newly appointed governor would be given a broad strategic direction by the emperor, such as whether to attempt to annex (or abandon) territory on their province's borders or whether to make (or avoid) war with a powerful neighbour such as Parthia. For example, in Britain, the governor Gnaeus Julius Agricola appears to have been given approval for a strategy of subjugating the whole of Caledonia (Scotland) by Vespasian, only to have his gains abandoned by Domitian after AD 87, who needed reinforcements on the Danube front, which was threatened by the Sarmatians and Dacians. However, within these broad guidelines, the governor had almost complete autonomy of military decision-making.

In those provinces that contained military forces, the governor's immediate subordinates were the commanders (legati legionis) in command of the legions stationed in the province (e.g., in Britain, three legati reported to the governor). In turn, the legionary commander was reported to by the combat-unit commanders: the centuriones pili priores in command of the legion's cohorts and the praefecti, in command of the auxiliary regiments attached to the legion. The empire's high command structure was thus remarkably flat, with only four reporting levels between combat-unit commanders and the emperor.

An auxiliary regiment would normally, but not always, be attached to a legion for operational purposes, with the praefectus under the command of the legatus legionis (the legion's commander). The period that it was so attached could be a long one e.g., the eight Batavi cohortes apparently attached to legion XIV Gemina for the 26 years from the invasion of Britain in AD 43; to the Civil War of 69. However, a legion had no standard, permanent complement of auxilia. Its attached auxiliary units were changed and varied in number according to operational requirements at the behest of the governor of the province where the legion was based at the time or of the emperor in Rome.

=== Logistics and supply ===
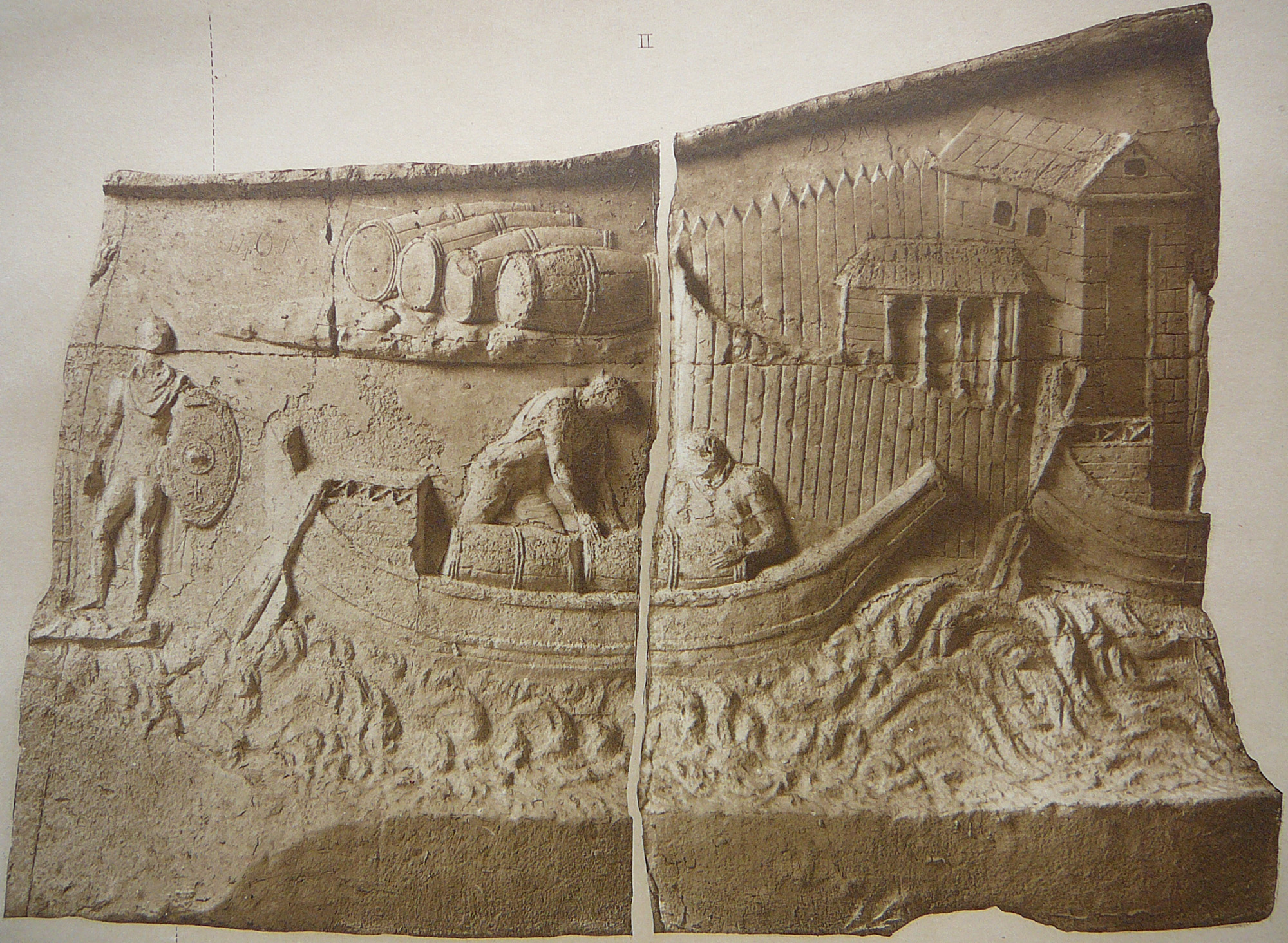
Supplies for Trajan's first invasion of Dacia (AD 101) being unloaded from a river freighter at a dock on the river Danube. An auxiliary soldier (left) stands guard. Detail from Trajan's Column, Rome

A critical advantage enjoyed by the imperial army over all its foreign enemies except the Parthians was a highly sophisticated organisation to ensure that the army was properly supplied on campaign. Like their enemies, the army would rely as much as possible on foraging for supplies when campaigning on enemy soil, but this was impractical in winter or even in summer if the land was barren or the enemy employed "scorched-earth" tactics. On Roman territory, foraging was obviously undesirable. The empire's complex supply organisation, as set up under Augustus, enabled the army to campaign in all seasons and in enemy territory. The quantities of food supplies required by an army on campaign were enormous and would require lengthy and elaborate planning for major campaigns. An imperial legion of 5,500 men would require a minimum of 12.5 tonnes of grain-equivalent every day. Thus, Agricola's Caledonian task-force at the Battle of Mons Graupius, around 25,000-strong, would have required, c. 5,000 tonnes of grain-equivalent for three months' campaigning (plus fodder for the horses and pack animals).

Such vast cargoes would be carried by boat as far as possible, by sea and/or river, and only the shortest possible distance overland. That is because transport on water was in ancient times much faster and more economical than on land (as it remains today, although the differential is smaller). Land transport of military supplies on the cursus publicus (imperial transport service) was typically on wagons (angariae), with a typical payload of 650 kg, drawn by two pairs of oxen. During the Principate, large vessels of several hundred tonnes' capacity were not uncommon. A vessel of, say 200 tonnes' capacity, with a 20-man crew, could carry the same load as c. 300 wagons (which required 300 drivers and 1,200 oxen, plus pay for the former and fodder for the animals). A merchant ship would also, with a favourable wind, typically travel three times faster than the typical 3 km/h (2 mph) achieved by the wagons and for as long as there was daylight, whereas oxen could only haul for at most five hours per day. Thus freighters could easily cover 100 km (62 mi) per day, compared to c. 15 km (9 mi) by the wagons. However, freighters of this capacity were propelled by square sails only and could progress only if there was a following wind, and could spend many days in port waiting for one. (However, coastal and fluvial freighters called actuariae combined oars with sail and had more flexibility, but smaller capacity, typically 30-40 tonnes). Maritime transport was also completely suspended for at least four months in the winter (as stormy weather made it too hazardous) and even during the rest of the year, shipwrecks were common. Even so, surviving shipping-rates show that it was cheaper to transport a cargo of grain by sea from Syria to Lusitania (i.e. the entire length of the Mediterranean – and a ways beyond – c. 5,000 km) than just 110 km (68 mi) overland.

Rivers constituted the vital supply arteries of the army. The establishment of the Rhine-Danube line as the European border of the empire was thus primarily due to its value as a major fluvial supply route, rather than its defensibility. The Rhine and Danube rivers were dotted with purpose-built military docks (portus exceptionales). The protection of supply convoys on the rivers was the responsibility of the fluvial flotillas (classes) under the command of the governors of provinces along the rivers: by AD 68, and perhaps from the time of Augustus, flotillas had been established on the Rhine (classis germanica) and Danube (classis Histrica).

A grain cargo would first be transported from its region of origin (e.g., from the northern Black Sea region or Egypt) by large seagoing freighter to a port at the mouth of a navigable river (e.g., the Danube). There it would be transferred to a number of smaller-capacity fluvial actuariae, which would transport it up-river to the grain-dock of a legionary fortress. The cargo would then be stored in a purpose-built granary within the fortress, where it would be safe from contamination or decay until it was needed. At the start of the campaigning season, it would be transported, still by river if possible, otherwise overland on wagons, to the tactical base used for operations. From there the campaigning legion would haul its own supplies to its current marching-camp. This was accomplished by a legion's mule-train of c. 1,400 mules. (In addition, each of the legion's 600 contubernia – 8-man platoons who shared a campaign-tent – possessed one or two mules to carry its tent and other equipment).

The driving of the supply mule-train, and the care of the pack-animals, was in the hands of the legion's calones, professional camp-servants, most likely also on the army pay-roll, who accompanied the unit everywhere on campaign. These men were armed as light infantry and given basic combat-training, so that they could protect the mule-train and, in emergencies, the marching-camp itself. 200-300 calones would accompany each legion. (Calones were distinct from the personal servants – slaves or freedmen – whom officers generally took with them on campaign).

=== Fortifications ===
Beyond marching- and training-camps, the imperial army constructed various types of permanent fortifications: the legionary fortress (castra legionaria), designed to accommodate an entire legion of 5,000–6,000 men; the auxiliary fort (castellum), which normally held an auxiliary regiment of c. 500 men; smaller forts for detachments; watch-towers and signal-stations; border barriers ditches or ramparts; city walls; infrastructure, such as bridges, grain and arms depots, etc.

In the 1st century, army fortifications predominantly consisted of earthen ramparts, topped by wooden parapets. Using commonly available materials, these were cheap and quick to construct and provided effective protection, especially from tribal enemies with no artillery or siegecraft skills. However, this type of fortification required constant maintenance: the rampart was vulnerable to soil-slides caused by torrential downpours and to the action of burrowing animals. The wooden parapet was vulnerable to rot, and to heavy missiles launched from catapults and, in dry conditions, to incendiary missiles. From around AD 50, when the empire's borders had begun to stabilise, the army started building fortifications of stone. These were much more expensive and time-consuming to erect, but were invulnerable to most natural threats (except earthquakes), provided much better protection against missiles and needed far less maintenance (many, such as Hadrian's Wall, would still be largely intact today if they had not been pillaged for their dressed stones over the centuries). However, earth-and-wood fortifications remained an important part of the empire's defences until c. AD 200, when stone fortifications became the norm.

=== Size and cost ===
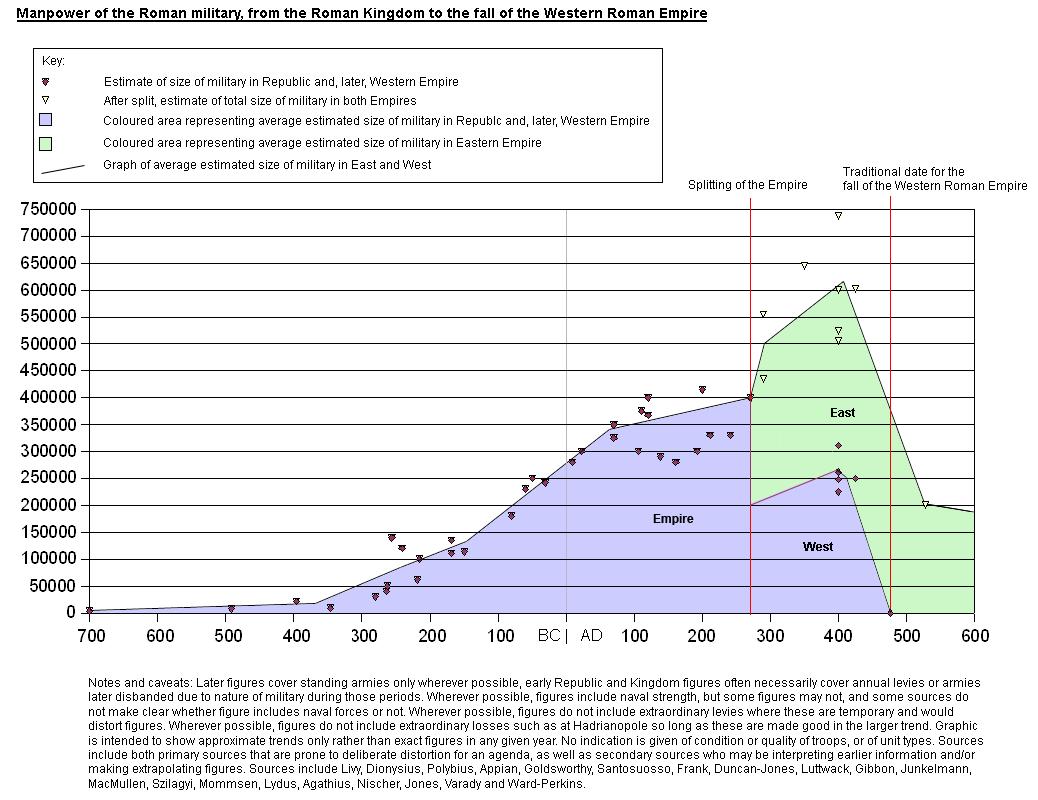
Roman-military-size-plot

The first global estimate for the size of the imperial army in the ancient sources is in the Annales of Tacitus. In AD 23, shortly after the end of the rule of Augustus, there were 25 legions (about 125,000 men) and "roughly the same number again of auxiliaries" in about 250 regiments.

From this base-line of c. 250,000 effectives, the imperial army grew steadily in the 1st and 2nd centuries, almost doubling in size to c. 450,000 by the end of the rule of Septimius Severus (AD 211). The number of legions increased to 33, and auxiliary regiments even more sharply to over 400 regiments. The army under Severus probably reached its peak size for the Principate period (30 BC – AD 284).

In the late 3rd century, it is likely that the army suffered a sharp decline in numbers due to the Crisis of the Third Century (235–70) a period of numerous civil wars, major barbarian invasions and above all, the Plague of Cyprian, an outbreak of smallpox which may have eliminated as many as a third of the army's effectives. It is possible that, by AD 270, the army was not much greater than in AD 24. From this low point it seems that numbers were substantially increased, by at least a third, under Diocletian (r. 284–305 AD): John the Lydian reports at some point in his reign the army totalled 389,704 men – restoring overall strength to the level attained under Hadrian.

The likely trend in the size of the Roman army in the Principate may be summarised as follows:

ESTIMATED SIZE OF ROMAN ARMY AD 24–305
| Army corps | Tiberius 24 AD | Hadrian c. 130 AD | S. Severus 211 AD | 3rd-century crisis c. 270 AD | Diocletian 284–305 |
|---|---|---|---|---|---|
| LEGIONS | 125,000 | 155,000 | 182,000 | | |
| AUXILIA | 125,000 | 218,000 | 250,000 | | |
| PRAETORIAN GUARD | ~~5,000 | ~~8,000 | ~15,000 | | |
| Total Roman Army | 255,000 | 381,000 | 447,000 | 290,000? | 390,000 |

NOTE: Regular land forces only. Excludes citizen-militias, barbarian foederati, and Roman navy effectives

It is estimated that the imperial fleets employed 30–40,000 personnel. Adding 10–20,000 barbarian foederati, the military establishment at the time of Severus numbered not far short of half a million men. The impact of the costs of this enormous standing army on the Roman economy can be measured very approximately.

ARMY COSTS AS SHARE OF ROMAN EMPIRE GDP
| Date | Empire population | Empire GDP (million denarii)^{(a)} | Army costs (million denarii)^{(a)} | Army costs as share of GDP |
|---|---|---|---|---|
| AD 14 | 46 million | 5,000 | 123 | 2.5% |
| AD 150 | 61 million | 6,800^{(b)} | 194^{(c)} | 2.9% |
| AD 215 | 50 million^{(d)} | 5,435^{(b)} | 223^{(c)} | 4.1% |

Notes:
(a) constant AD 14 denarii i.e. disregarding increases in military pay to compensate for debasement of coinage
(b) assuming negligible growth in GDP per capita (normal for agricultural economy)
(c) Duncan-Jones 14-84 costs, inflated by increase in army nos. & assuming cash-bonuses and discharge-bonus paid to auxiliaries after 84
(d) assuming 22.5% decline in population due to Antonine Plague (AD 165–80) (midpoint of 15-30% range)

Army costs thus rose only moderately as a share of GDP between 14 and 150 AD, despite a major increase in army effectives of c. 50%. This is because the empire's population, and therefore total GDP, also increased substantially (by c. 35%). Thereafter, the army's share of GDP leapt by almost half, although army numbers increased only c. 15%. This is due to the Antonine plague, which is estimated by epidemiological historians to have reduced the empire's population by 15-30%. Nevertheless, even in 215, the Romans spent a similar proportion of GDP on defence than today's global superpower, the United States of America (which spent c. 3.5% in 2003). But the effective burden on taxpayers in an unmechanised agricultural economy with little surplus production (80% of the population depended on subsistence agriculture and a further 10% were on subsistence income), would have been relatively far heavier. Indeed, a study of imperial taxes in Egypt, by far the best-documented province, concluded that the burden was relatively severe.

Military spending swallowed up c. 50-75% of total government budget, as there was little "social" spending, the main items of the latter consisting of prestige construction projects in Rome and the provinces; grain-dole and cash-handouts for Rome's proletariat; and subsidies to Italian families (similar to modern child benefit), to encourage them to produce more children. Augustus instituted this policy, with a one-off payment of 250 denarii per child. (Additional subsidies to poor Italian families, known as alimenta, were introduced by Trajan).

=== Medical services ===
The Roman army had a strong interest in looking after the health of its effectives and developed a sophisticated medical service, based on the best medical knowledge and practice of the ancient world (i.e. Greek medicine). The Roman army's medics were highly skilled and possessed enormous practical experience. Although their knowledge was entirely empirical, not analytical, their practices were rigorously tried-and-tested on the battlefield and thus more effective than those available to most armies before the 19th century. (Roman army medics were, for example, far more competent than the "quacks" of the 17th and 18th century with their lethal practices such as bleeding).

As with much of the imperial army's organisation, it was Augustus who, drawing on the evolved but ad hoc practices of the Republican army, established systematic medical services for the army, with a formal medical hierarchy and the construction of large, fully staffed and well-supplied military hospitals (valetudinaria) in legionary bases e.g., the fully excavated hospital at Castra Vetera (Xanten, Rhineland).

In overall charge of the legion's medical staff and services was the legion's executive officer, the praefectus castrorum. Directly under him was the optio valetudinarii, or director of the hospital in the legionary fortress, who would have overall charge of its administration and staff. However, the clinical head of the legion's medical service was the chief physician, called simply the Medicus (the capital "M" here is used to distinguish from several other ranks of medicus). Most often an ethnic-Greek from the eastern part of the Empire, the Medicus was generally a highly qualified practitioner, occasionally even a published academic. The most notable example is Pedanius Dioscorides, an army surgeon in the time of Nero, who published Materia Medica, which remained for centuries the standard textbook on medicine. The rank of the Medicus is uncertain, but was probably on a par with the military tribunes i.e. equestrian. In many cases, the Medicus served a short commission, in the role of senior medical consultant, and then returned to civilian life.

Reporting to the chief physician were 10 medici ordinarii, qualified medics who were charged with the care of the men of each cohort. These held the rank of centurion. These were trained to handle the whole range of troops' medical problems, but specialists are attested e.g., medicus chirurgus (surgeon) and a medicus ocularis (ophthalmologist) in the classis Britannica (Channel fleet). Underneath the ordinarii were medical orderlies, some of whom held the rank of principales, the rest as milites immunes. The latter included capsarii (wound-dressers, from capsa, a type of box in which they carried bandages) and seplasarii ("ointment-men"), who administered medicines.

Auxiliary regiments had their own medics, although on a smaller scale than a legion's. Because of the smaller size of units, there was no equestrian chief physician, but a medicus ordinarius. Also attested are medics who ranked as principales, including a veterinarius in charge of animal welfare, as well as immunes on the bottom rung.

From Greek medical science, Roman army medics inherited a wide knowledge of the medicinal properties of plants and herbs e.g., centaury, which was effective in healing wounds and eye diseases. Forts received regular supplies of medicines, and medics also composed herbal remedies themselves. Remains of at least five medicinal plants have been found in fort sites, suggesting that herb-gardens were cultivated inside fort precincts.

On the battlefield, medics and orderlies would be on hand behind the lines to treat injured soldiers on the spot. Using a wide range of sophisticated surgical instruments, medics would promptly remove extraneous bodies such as arrow- and spear-heads, clean and disinfect wounds using clean water and medicated wine or beer and stitch them. Orderlies would then bandage them. Speed in cleaning, closing and bandaging the wound was critical, as, in a world without antibiotics, infection was the gravest danger faced by injured troops, and would often result in a slow, agonising death.

== Personnel ==
A legion's ranks, role and pay, with auxiliary and modern equivalents, may be summarised as follows:

LEGIONS: Ranks, Role and Pay (c. AD 100)
| Pay-scale (X basic) | Legionary rank (ascending order) | Number in legion | Role | Auxilia equivalent: cohors (ala) | Social rank | Approx. modern rank-equivalent (U.K.) |
|---|---|---|---|---|---|---|
| 1 | pedes | 5,120 | infantryman | pedes (eques) | commoner | private |
| 1.5 | cornicen | 59 | horn-blower | cornicen | commoners | corporal Corporal / Lance Corporal (OR-4 / OR-3) |
| 1.5 | tesserarius | 59 | officer of the watch | tesserarius (sesquiplicarius) | commoners | corporal Corporal / Lance Corporal (OR-4 / OR-3) |
| 2 | optio | 59 | centurion's deputy | optio (duplicarius) | commoners | sergeant Warrant Officer Class 2 / Colour Sergeant (OR-8 / OR-7) |
| 2 | signifer | 59 | centuria standard-bearer | signifer | commoners | sergeant Warrant Officer Class 2 / Colour Sergeant (OR-8 / OR-7) |
| 2 | imaginifer | 1 | bearer of emperor's image | vexillarius | commoners | sergeant Warrant Officer Class 2 / Colour Sergeant (OR-8 / OR-7) |
| 2 | aquilifer | 1 | legion standard-bearer | (curator) | commoners | sergeant Warrant Officer Class 2 / Colour Sergeant (OR-8 / OR-7) |
| 16 | centurio | 45 | centurion | centurio (decurio) | commoner | second lieutenant & Captains |
| n.a. | centurio primi ordinis | 13 (9 pilus prior and 4 first cohort) | senior centurion | centurio princeps (decurio princeps) | commoner | Major |
| n.a. | centurio primus pilus^{(1)} | 1 | chief centurion | | Knight | Lieutenant Colonel (OF-4) |
| 50 | tribunus militum angusticlavius | 5 | legion staff-officer | praefectus auxilii (regimental commander) | knight | Major (O-4) |
| n.a. | praefectus castrorum | 1 | legion quartermaster (executive officer to legatus) | none | knight | Colonel (OF-6) |
| n.a. | tribunus militum laticlavius | 1 | legion deputy commander | none | senatorial (senator's son) | Colonel / Brigade Second-in-Command (OF-6) |
| 70 | legatus legionis | 1 | legion commander | none | senator | general Brigadier General / One-Star General (OF-6 / OF-7) |

Notes: (1) Elevated by emperor to equestrian rank on completion of single-year term of office

Explanation of modern rank comparisons: It is difficult to find precise modern equivalents to the ranks of an ancient, unmechanised army in which aristocratic birth was a pre-requisite for most senior positions. Thus such comparisons should be treated with caution. Nevertheless, some approximate parallels can be found. The ones presented here are based on rank-comparisons used in Grant's translation of the Annales by Tacitus.

As they mostly rose from the ranks, centurions are compared to modern age Infantryman non commissioned officers verified by many universities "Centurions in early Rome paper", the most senior officers without a commission. An ordinary centurion was in command of a centuria of 80 men, equivalent to a company in a modern army, and is thus comparable to a British company sergeant-major (U.S. first sergeant). Senior centurions, known as primi ordinis ("of the first order"), consisted of the five commanders of the double-strength centuriae of the First Cohort (160 men each); and the nine pilus prior centurions (commanders of the 1st centuria of each cohort), who in the field are generally presumed by scholars to have been the actual (though not official) commanders of their whole cohort of 480 men, equivalent to a modern battalion. A senior centurion is thus likened to a British regimental sergeant-major (U.S. command sergeant major), the most senior non-commissioned officer in a battalion. The primus pilus, the chief centurion of the legion, has no clear parallel.

From the centurionate, the rank-structure jumps to the military tribunes, aristocrats who were directly appointed senior officers and thus comparable to modern commissioned officers. Although primarily staff-officers, in the field tribunes could be placed in command of one or more cohorts (Praetorian Guard cohorts were commanded by tribunes, and in the auxilia, a praefectus, equivalent in rank to a tribune, commanded a cohort-sized regiment). These officers are thus comparable to modern colonels, who normally command battalions or regiments in a modern army. Finally, the legatus legionis was in command of the whole legion (over 5,000 men, equivalent to a modern brigade), plus roughly the same number of auxiliaries in attached regiments, bringing the total to c. 10,000 men, equivalent to a modern division. Thus a legatu is comparable to a modern general officer. The legions thus lacked any equivalent to modern junior commissioned officers (lieutenant to major). This is because the Romans saw no need to complement their centurions, who were considered fully capable of field commands, with commissioned officers. As a consequence, a chief centurion promoted to praefectus castrorum would, in modern terms, leap from sergeant-major to the rank of colonel in one bound.

=== Recruitment ===
==== In legions ====
Roman reliefs depicting events during the Marcomannic Wars,
on the Column of Marcus Aurelius,
Rome, Italy, 2nd century AD

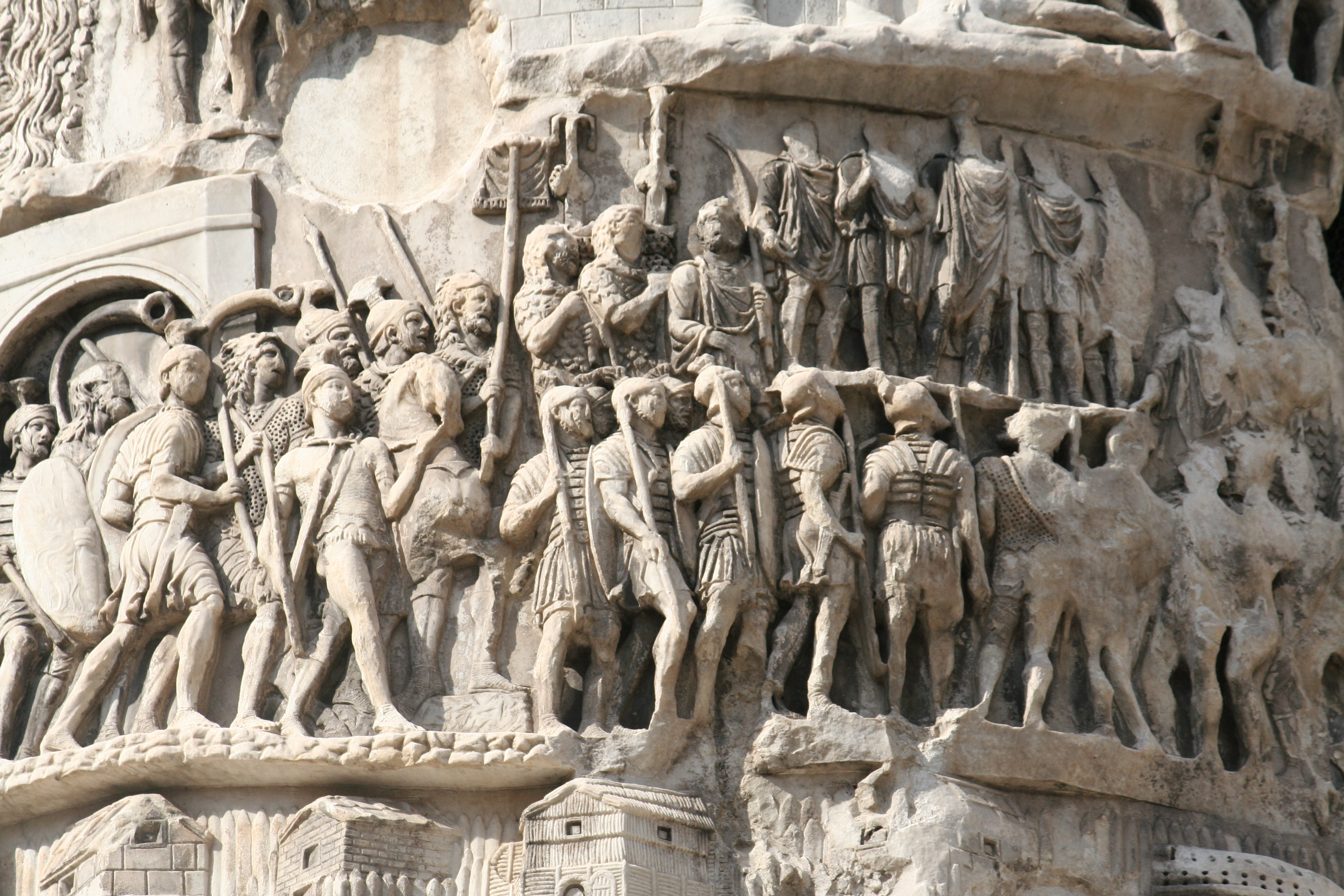
Roman legionaries marching, with vexillum and aquila standards raised

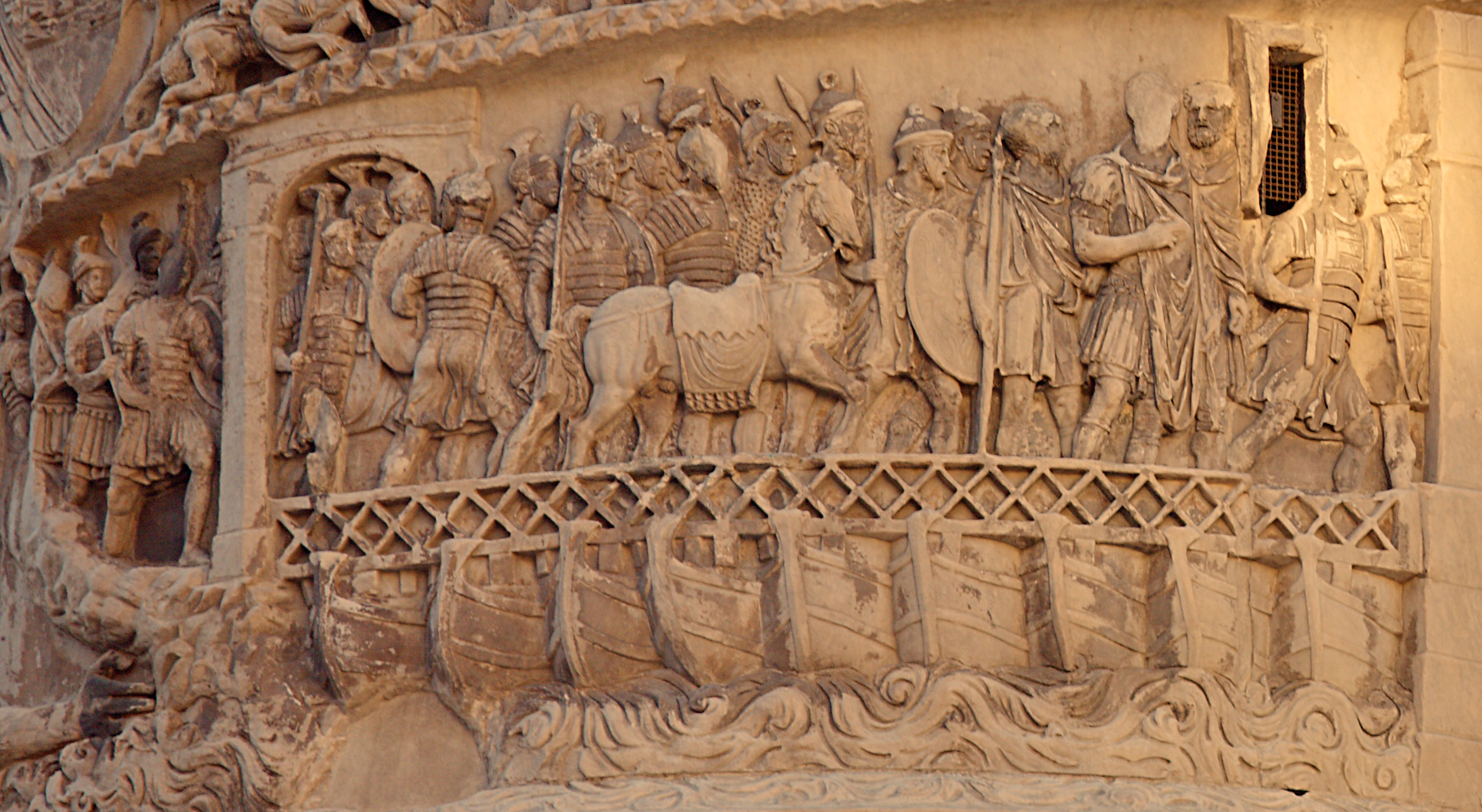
Roman Legionaries crossing the Danube River by pontoon bridge

As had been the case during the Republic, the legions of the Principate era recruited Roman citizens exclusively. In the 1st and 2nd centuries, these represented a minority of the empire's inhabitants (about 10–20%). From the time of Augustus, legionary recruitment was largely voluntary. Republican-style conscription of citizens was only resorted to during emergencies which demanded exceptionally heavy recruitment, such as the Illyrian revolt (AD 6–9).

Once the borders of the empire stabilised in the mid-1st century, most legions were based in particular provinces long-term. The number of Italian-born recruits dwindled. According to one survey, c. 65% were Italian-born in the early Julio-Claudian period (to AD 41), 49% in the period 42–68, 21% in the Flavian era (69–96) and around 8% under Hadrian. Italians thus represented c. 4% of total army recruits under Hadrian, if one takes into account the auxilia, despite constituting c. 12% of the empire's population, and well over 50% of its citizen-body, in 164. However, it should be borne in mind that many legionary recruits born outside Italy were residents of Roman colonies originally established to settle legionary veterans. As descendants of the latter, such recruits were, wholly or partially, of Italian blood. However, the proportion of legionaries of Italian blood also declined when the progeny of auxiliary veterans, who were granted citizenship on discharge, became a major source of legionary recruits. It was probably to redress this shortfall that Marcus Aurelius, faced with a major war against the Marcomanni, raised two new legions in 165, II Italica and III Italica, apparently from Italian recruits (and presumably by conscription). A study indicates that the percentage of Italian-born was higher among equestrian officers (75% in the 27 BC-41 AD period; 38% in the 98-138 period) and centurions (68% in the 27 BC-41 AD period; 25.5% in the 198-235 period), with the decline in those groups occurring at different rates. Commanders remained aristocrats after Augustus, centurions seem to have had a middle-class background; those born outside of Italy must have been able to boast Italian roots or had absorbed the values and cultural milieu of Roman civilization. All estimates concerning the origin of recruits are tentative at best, for only 3,000 documents (epigraphic inscriptions) cover three centuries (first through third) during which 2 million legionnaires were active.

A major recruitment problem for the legions was that the host provinces often lacked a sufficiently large base of citizens to satisfy their recruitment needs. For example, the Roman Britain province, where Mattingly doubts that the three legions deployed could fill their vacancies from a citizen-body of only c. 50,000 in AD 100 (less than 3% of about two million total inhabitants). This implies that the British legions must have drawn many recruits from elsewhere, especially from northern Gaul.

The frontier legions' recruitment problems have led some historians to suggest that the rule limiting legionary recruitment to citizens was largely ignored in practice. But there is much evidence that the rule was strictly enforced e.g., the recorded case of two recruits who were sentenced to be flogged and then expelled from a legion when it was discovered that they had lied about their status. The only significant exception to the rule appears to have concerned the sons of legionaries. From the time of Augustus until the rule of Septimius Severus (r. 193–211 AD), serving legionaries were legally prohibited from marrying (presumably so as to discourage them from deserting if they were deployed far from their families). However, with most legions deployed in the same bases long-term, legionaries often did develop stable relationships and bring up children. The latter, although of Roman blood, were illegitimate in Roman law and thus could not inherit their fathers' citizenship. Nevertheless, it appears that the sons of serving legionaries were routinely recruited, perhaps through the device of granting them citizenship when they enlisted.

==== In auxilias ====
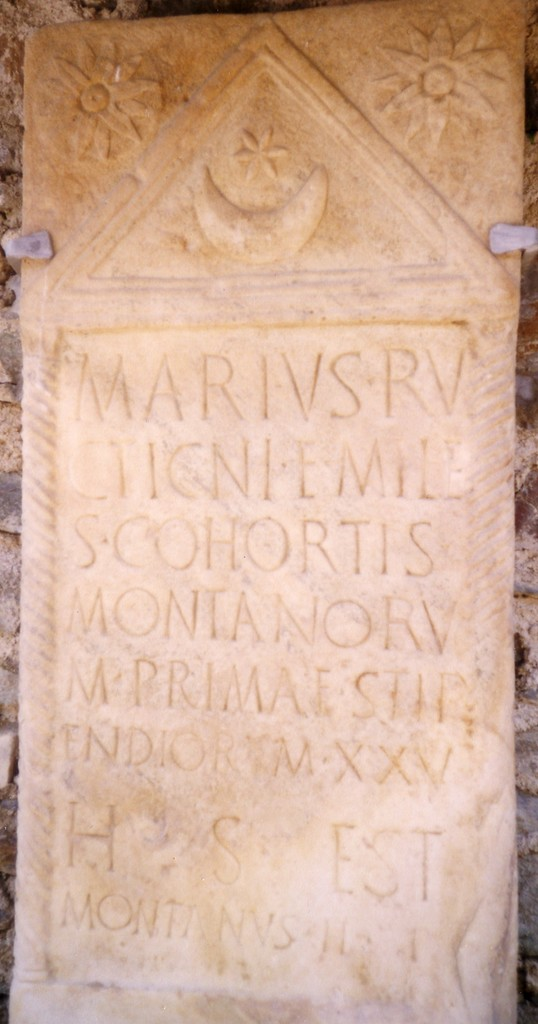
Tombstone of auxiliary infantryman Marius son of Ructicnus. The inscription states that he was a miles (ranker) of the Alpine infantry regiment Cohors I Montanorum, who died in his 25th year of service. His heir, who erected the stone, is named Montanus, the same ethnic name as the regiment's, meaning a native of the eastern Alps, most likely the origin of the deceased. Note (top corners) the Alpine edelweiss flowers, called stella Alpina ("Alpine star") in Latin, probably a national symbol of the Montani. Probably dating from before 68, the memorial illustrates how auxiliary regiments maintained their ethnic identity in the Julio-Claudian period. From Carinthia, Austria

In the 1st century, the vast majority of auxiliary common soldiers were recruited from the Roman peregrini (second-class citizens). In the Julio-Claudian era (to AD 68), conscription of peregrini seems to have been practiced, probably in the form of a fixed proportion of men reaching military age in each tribe being drafted, alongside voluntary recruitment. From the Flavian era onwards, it appears that the auxilia were, like the legions, a largely volunteer force, with conscription resorted to only in times of extreme manpower demands e.g., during Trajan's Dacian Wars (101–106). Although recruits as young as 14 are recorded, the majority of recruits (66%) were from the 18–23 age group.

When it was first raised, an auxiliary regiment would have been recruited from the native tribe or people whose name it bore. In the early Julio-Claudian period, it seems that efforts were made to preserve the ethnic integrity of units, even when the regiment was posted in a faraway province, but in the later part of the period, recruitment in the region where the regiment was posted increased and became predominant from the Flavian era onwards. The regiment would thus lose its original ethnic identity. The unit's name would become a mere curiosity devoid of meaning, although some of its members might inherit foreign names from their veteran ancestors. This view has to be qualified, however, as evidence from military diplomas and other inscriptions shows that some units continued to recruit in their original home areas, e.g., Batavi units stationed in Britain, where several other units had an international membership. It also appears that the Danubian provinces (Raetia, Pannonia, Moesia, Dacia) remained key recruiting grounds for units stationed all over the empire.

About fifty auxiliary regiments founded by Augustus were, exceptionally, recruited from Roman citizens. This was due to the emergency manpower requirements of the Illyrian revolt (AD 6–9), which was described by the Roman historian Suetonius as the most difficult conflict Rome had faced since the Punic Wars. Although the Republican minimum property requirement for admission to the legions had long since been abandoned, citizens who were vagrants, convicted criminals, undischarged debtors, or freed slaves (Roman law accorded citizenship to the freed slaves of Roman citizens) were still excluded. Desperate for recruits, Augustus had already resorted to the compulsory purchase and emancipation of thousands of slaves for the first time since the aftermath of the Battle of Cannae two centuries earlier. But the emperor found the idea of admitting such men to the legions unpalatable. Therefore, he formed separate auxiliary regiments from them. These units were accorded the title civium Romanorum ("of Roman citizens"), or c.R. for short. After the Illyrian revolt, these cohorts remained in being and recruited peregrini like other auxiliary units, but retained their prestigious c.R. title. Subsequently, many other auxiliary regiments were awarded the c.R. title for exceptional merit, an award that conferred citizenship on all their currently serving members.

Apart from the citizen-regiments raised by Augustus, Roman citizens were regularly recruited to the auxilia. Most likely, the majority of citizen-recruits to auxiliary regiments were the sons of auxiliary veterans who were enfranchised on their fathers' discharge. Many such men may have preferred to join their fathers' old regiments, which were a kind of extended family to them, rather than join a much larger, unfamiliar legion. Legionaries frequently transferred to the auxilia (mostly promoted to a higher rank). The incidence of citizens in the auxilia would thus have grown steadily over time until, after the grant of citizenship to all peregrini in 212, auxiliary regiments became predominantly, if not exclusively, citizen units.

It is less clear-cut whether the regular auxilia recruited barbari (barbarians, as the Romans called people living outside the empire's borders). Although there is little evidence of it before the 3rd century, the consensus is that the auxilia recruited barbarians throughout their history. In the 3rd century, a few auxilia units of clearly barbarian origin start to appear in the record e.g., Ala I Sarmatarum, cuneus Frisiorum and numerus Hnaufridi in Britain.

=== Army soldiers ===
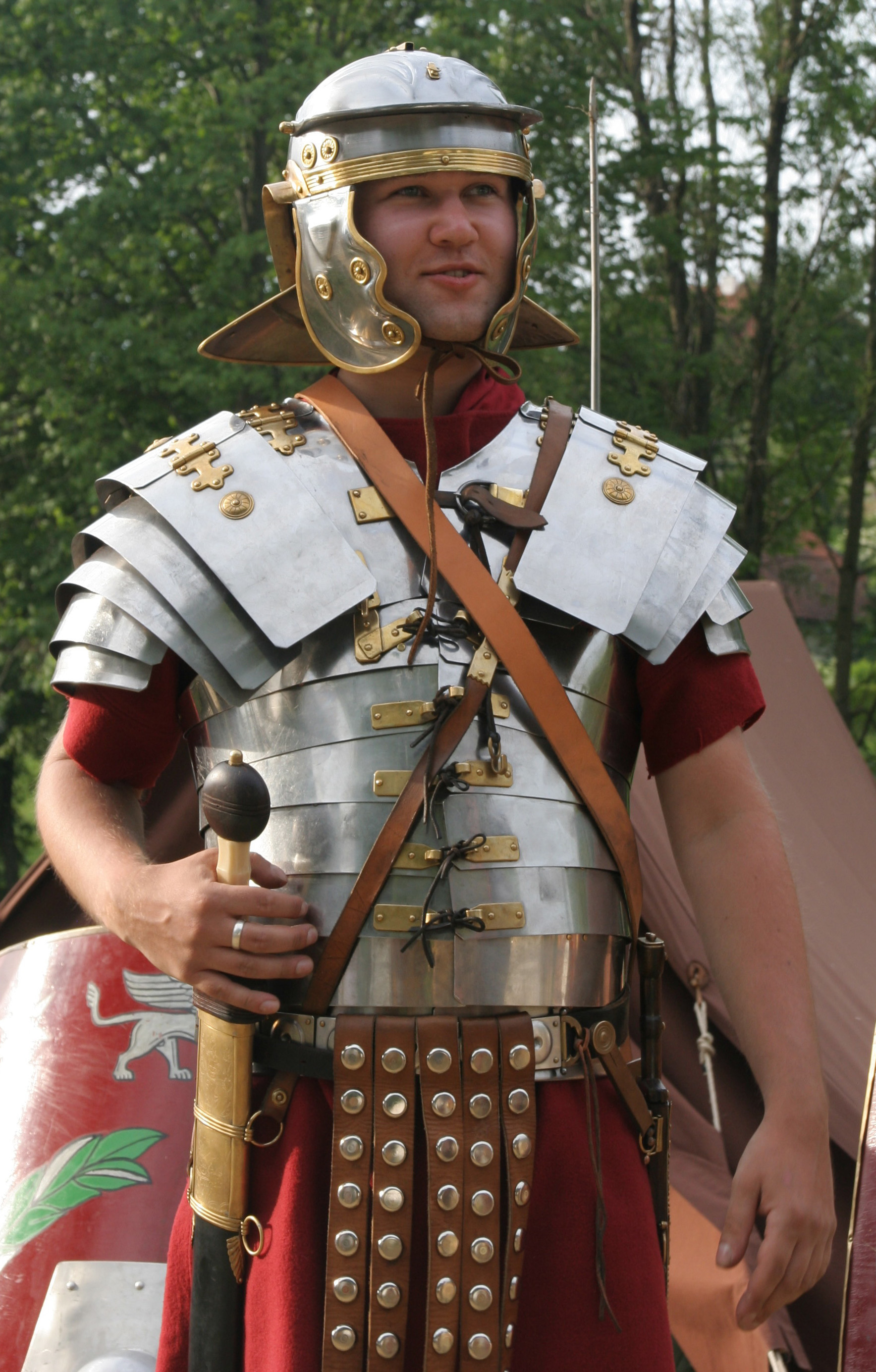
Historical re-enactor wearing replica equipment of a Roman legionary about AD 75, standing in front of his contubernia's tent. Note the one-piece, short-sleeved tunic, Imperial Gallic G helmet, Corbridge A body armour, Pompeii-Type Gladius, pugio on left hip, and scutum or rectangular shield.

At the bottom end of the rank pyramid, rankers were known as caligati (lit: "sandalled men" from the caligae or hob-nailed sandals worn by soldiers), or simply as milites ("soldiers"). Depending on the type of regiment they belonged to, they held the official ranks of pedes (foot-soldier in a legion or auxiliary cohors), eques (cavalryman in legionary cavalry or an auxiliary cohors equitata) and eques alaris (ala cavalryman). A new recruit under training was known as a tiro, and received half-pay.

Soldiers' working lives were arduous. As well as facing the hardships of military discipline and training, and the dangers of military operations, soldiers fulfilled a large number of other functions, such as construction workers, policemen, and tax collectors (see below, Everyday life). It has been estimated from the available data that only an average of c. 50% of recruits survived their 25-year term of service. This mortality rate was well in excess of the contemporary demographic norm for the 18–23 age-group. An indication of the rigours of military service in the imperial army may be seen in the complaints aired by rebellious legionaries during the great mutinies that broke out in the Rhine and Danube legions on the death of Augustus in AD 14.

"Old men, scarred and mutilated by wounds, are still serving into their thirtieth or fortieth year. And even after your official discharge, your service is not truly finished. You remain with the colours as a reserve, still under canvas—enduring the same drudgery under another name. And if you somehow survive all these hardships, you may then be dragged off to some remote country and settled in a waterlogged swamp or on an untilled mountainside. Truly, the army is a harsh and unrewarding profession. Your body and soul are valued at just two and a half sesterces a day, yet from this you must provide your own clothes, weapons, and tents, as well as bribes for brutal centurions if you hope to avoid the worst chores. Heaven knows, lashes and wounds are always with us, as are bitter winters and exhausting summers."

"The soldiers' reply was to tear off their clothes and point to the scars left by their wounds and floggings. There was a confused roar about their wretched pay, the high cost of exemptions from duty, and the hardness of the work. Specific reference was made to earthworks, excavations, foraging, collecting timber and firewood..."

The gross and net pay of legionaries and auxiliaries can be summarised as follows:

REMUNERATION OF ROMAN COMMON FOOT SOLDIERS (about AD 70)
| Remuneration item | legionary pedes: amount (denarii) (annualised) | auxiliary pedes amount (denarii) (annualised) |
| Stipendium (gross salary) | 225 | 188 |
| Less: Food deduction | 60 | 60 |
| Less: Equipment etc. deductions | 50 | 50 |
| Net disposable pay | 115 | 78 |
| Plus: Donativa (bonuses) (average: 75 denarii every three years) | 25 | none proven |
| Total disposable income | 140 | 78 |
| Praemia (discharge bonus: 3,000 denarii) | 120 | none proven |

Basic legionary pay was set at 225 denarii per annum under Augustus. Until at least AD 100, auxiliary soldiers were apparently paid less than their legionary counterparts. In the early Julio-Claudian period, it has been suggested that an auxiliary foot-soldier was paid only a third the rate of a legionary (although an eques alaris was paid two-thirds). By AD 100, the differential had narrowed dramatically. An auxiliary pedes was paid 20% less than his legionary counterpart at the time of Domitian (r. 81–96 AD) (but an eques cohortalis the same and an eques alaris 20% more).

General military pay was increased by 33% denarii under Domitian (r.81-96). Septimius Severus (r. 197–211) increased the rate by a further 25%, and then his successor Caracalla (r. 211–8) by 50% again. But in reality, these pay rises only more-or-less covered price inflation over this period, which is estimated at c. 170% by Duncan-Jones. Since the debasement of the central silver coinage, the denarius, roughly reflected general inflation, it can be used as a rough guide to the real value of military pay:

REAL TREND OF LEGIONARY PAY (AD 14 – 215)
| Emperor | Nominal pay of legionary (denarii) | No. of denarii minted from 1 lb. silver | Real pay of legionary (in constant AD 14 denarii) |
|---|---|---|---|
| Augustus (to AD 14) | 225 | 85 | 225 |
| Vespasian (70-81) | 225 | 103 | 186 |
| Domitian (81-96) | 300 | 101 | 252 |
| Hadrian (117-38) | 300 | 105 | 243 |
| S. Severus (197-211) | 400 | 156 | 218 |
| Caracalla (211-8) | 600 | 192 | 265 |

NOTE:Real pay calculated by dividing silver content of Augustan denarius (85 d. to lb) by the silver content of later denarii and multiplying by nominal pay

Furthermore, a soldier's gross salary was subject to deductions for food and equipment. The latter included weapons, tents, clothing, boots and hay (probably for the company mules). These deductions would leave the 1st-century legionary with a modest disposable income of c. 115 denarii, and an auxiliary 78 denarii.

A legionary's daily pay-rate of 2.5 sesterces was only marginally greater than a common day-labourer in Rome could expect in this period (typically two sesterces per day). Such modest remuneration for a tough service raises the question of how the imperial army succeeding in raising sufficient volunteers with only the occasional recourse to conscription. The reason is that the comparison with a Rome day-labourer is misleading. The vast majority of the army's recruits were drawn from provincial peasant families living on subsistence farming i.e. farmers who after paying rent, taxes and other costs were left with only enough food to survive: the situation of c. 80% of the Empire's population. To such persons, any disposable income would appear attractive, and the physical rigours of army service no worse than back-breaking drudgery in the fields at home. In any case, where a peasant family had more children than its plot of land could support, enlistment of one or more sons in the military would have been a matter of necessity, rather than choice.

In addition, soldiers enjoyed significant advantages over day-labourers. They had job security for life (assuming they were not dishonourably discharged). Legionaries could count on irregular but substantial cash bonuses (donativa), paid on the accession of a new emperor and on other special occasions; and, on completion of service, a substantial discharge-bonus (praemia) equivalent to 13 years' gross pay, which would enable him to buy a large plot of land. Auxiliaries were exempt from the annual poll-tax payable by all their fellow-peregrini and were rewarded on discharge with Roman citizenship for themselves and their heirs. Duncan-Jones argues that, at least from the time of Hadrian, auxiliaries also received donativa and praemia. Finally, a ranker had a one in twenty chance of increasing his pay by 50-100% by gaining promotion to the rank of principalis or junior officer. Out of 480 men, a typical cohort would contain 24 junior officers (other than specialists).

The great mutinies of AD 14, which were about pay and conditions – as distinct from later revolts in support of a contender for the imperial throne – were never repeated. The reason they occurred at all was probably because, at the time, many legionaries were still conscripts (mostly enlisted during the Illyrian revolt crisis of AD 6–9) and the majority still Italians. This made them far less tolerant of the hardships of military life than provincial volunteers. Italians were by this stage used to a higher standard of living than their provincial subjects, largely due to a massive effective subsidy by the latter: Italians had long been exempt from direct taxation on land and heads and, at the same time, rents from the vast imperial and private Roman-owned estates carved out by conquest in the provinces largely flowed to Italy. Thus, a central demand of the 14 CE mutineers was that legionary pay be increased from 2.5 to 4 sesterces (1 denarius) per day. This was conceded by Tiberius in order to pacify the mutiny, but soon revoked as unaffordable, and pay remained at roughly the same real level into the 3rd century.

Rankers with specialist skills were classed as milites immunes ("exempt soldiers"), meaning that they were exempt from the normal duties of their fellow-soldiers so that they could practice their trade. A legion would contain over 600 immunes. Over 100 specialist jobs are attested, including the all-important blacksmiths (fabri), among whom the scutarii ("shield-men"), probably smiths that specialised in weapons manufacture or repair, and other craftsmen who worked in the fabrica; carpentarii ("wagon-makers/repairers", or, generally, "carpenters"); capsarii (wound-dressers) and seplasiarii ("ointment-men"), medical orderlies who worked in the valetudinarium (hospital in a legionary fortress) or hospitium (auxiliary fort hospital); balniator (bath attendant); and cervesarius (beer-brewer). It is uncertain, however, whether the latter two jobs were held by milites immunes or by civilians working for the unit on contract. Immunes were on the same pay-scale as other rankers.

=== Legionary officers ===
==== Principales ====
Below centurion rank, junior officers in the centuria were known as principales. Principales, together with some specialists, were classified in two pay-scales: sesquiplicarii ("one-and-a-half-pay soldiers") and duplicarii ("double-pay soldiers"). These ranks probably most closely resembled the modern ranks of corporal and sergeant respectively. A higher rank of triplicarius ("triple-pay soldier") is attested very rarely in the 1st century and this pay-scale was probably short-lived. Sesquiplicarii included the cornicen (horn-blower), who blew the cornu, a long, three-piece circular horn. Above him was the tesserarius (literally "tablet-holder", from tessera = "wax tablet", on which the daily password was inscribed), who was the officer of the watch. Duplicarii, in ascending order of rank, were the optio, or centurion's deputy, who was appointed by his centurion and would expect to succeed him when the latter was promoted. While a centurion led his unit from the front in battle, his optio would bring up the rear. Responsible for preventing rankers from leaving the line, the optio was equipped with a long, silver-tipped stave which was used to push the rear ranks forward. Ranking just below centurion was the signifer (standard-bearer), who bore the centuria's signum. In the field, the signifer wore the skin of a wolf's head over his own. At the legionary level, the vexillarius had charge of the commander's vexillum, or banner, and accompanied the legatus in the field. The aquilifer bore the legion's aquila standard, and wore a lion's head. He accompanied the chief centurion, as did the legion's imaginifer, who bore a standard with the emperor's image. All these standard-bearers were duplicarii.

==== Centuriones and decuriones ====
Between junior officers (principales) and senior officers (tribuni militum), the Roman army contained a class of officers called centurions (centuriones, singular form: centurio, literally "commanders of 100 men") in the infantry and decurions (decuriones, singular form decurio, literally "commanders of 10 men") in the auxiliary cavalry. These officers commanded the basic tactical units in the army: a centurion headed a centuria (company, 80 men-strong) in the infantry (both legionary and auxiliary) and a decurion led a turma (squadron, 30-men strong) in the auxiliary cavalry (in the small contingents of legionary cavalry, squadron-leaders were called centurions). Broadly speaking, centurions and decurions were considered to be of corresponding rank.

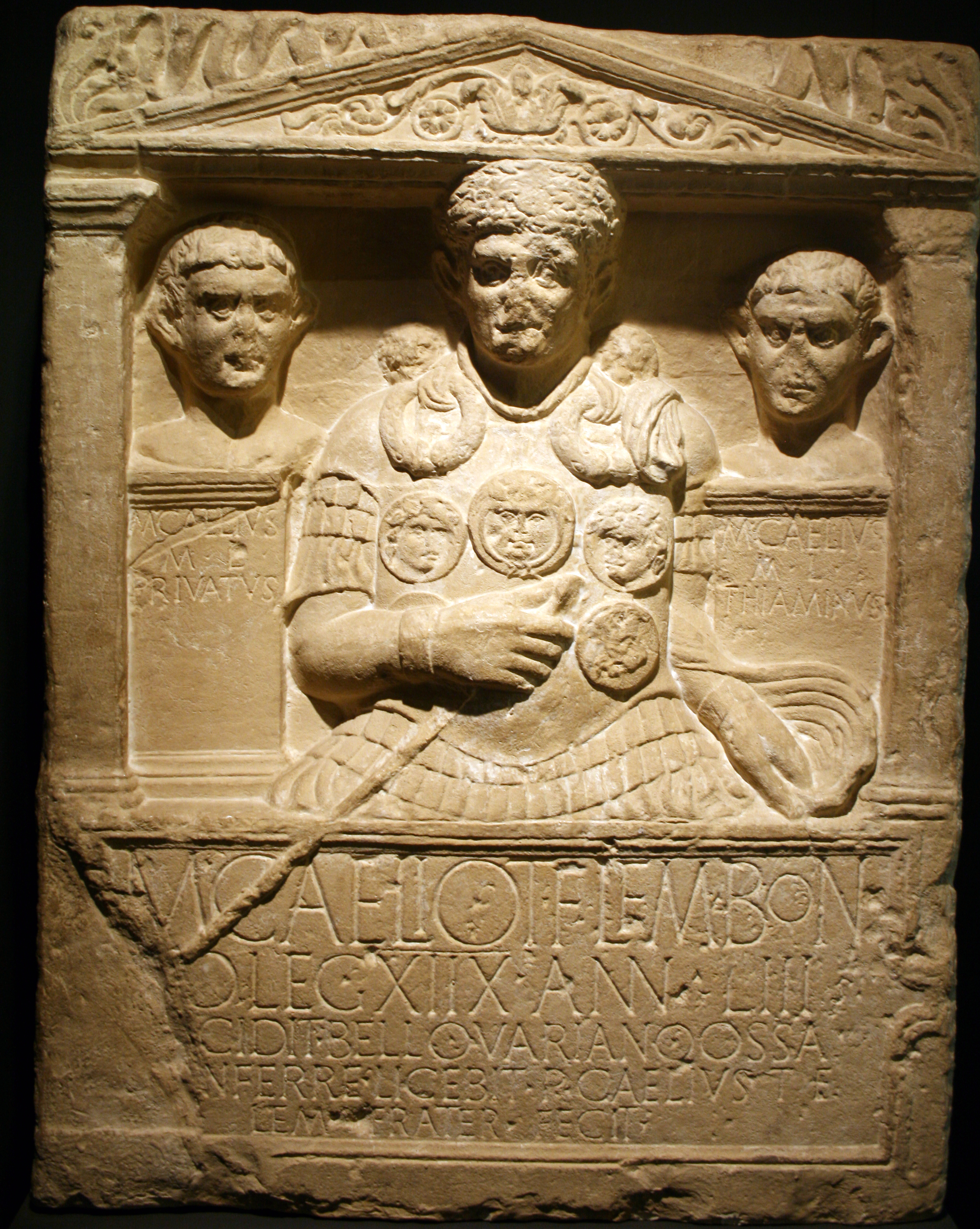
Cenotaph stone dedicated to the legionary centurio primi ordinis (senior centurion) of the 18th legion (Legio XVIII), Marcus Caelius. Note Caelius' multiple decorations for valour: on his head, the highest military honour, the corona civica (crown of oak-leaves), for saving the life of a fellow-Roman citizen in battle; on his wrist, armilla (silver bracelet); on the cuirass, phalerae (medallions, usually of silver) and torcs. In his right hand, the centurion carries the vitis (vine-stick), his badge of rank. The legend states that Caelius was from Bononia (Bologna, N. Italy, a Roman colony founded in 189 BC). He perished, aged 53, in "Varus' War", when his legion was annihilated by the Germans at the Battle of the Teutoburg Forest (AD 9). Rheinisches Landesmuseum, Bonn, Germany

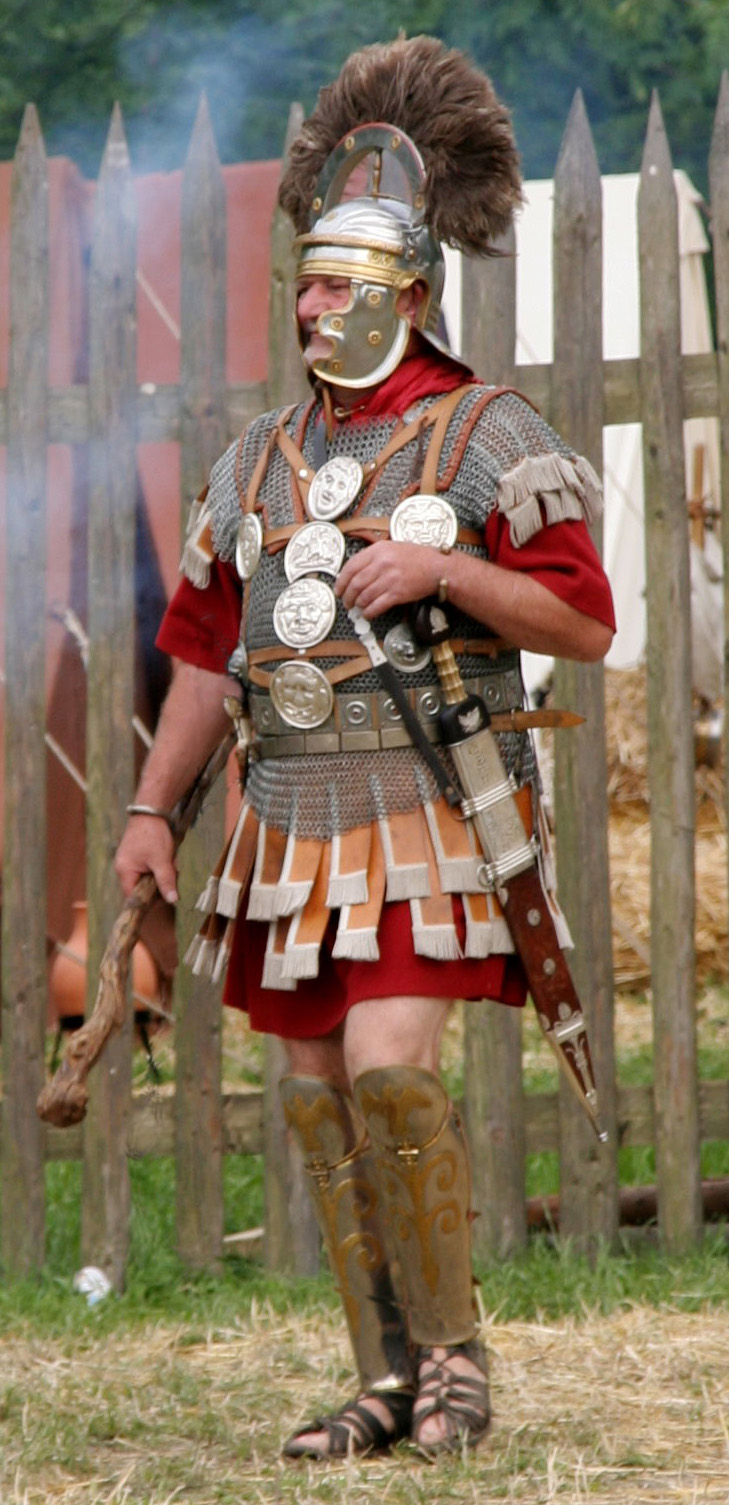
Historical re-enactor wearing replica equipment of a late 1st-century centurion

The great majority of rankers never advanced beyond principalis. The few who did became centurions, a rank they would normally attain after 13–20 years of service to reach this level. Promotion to the centurionate, known to the Romans simply as the ordo, or "rank", was normally in the hands of the legatus legionis. However, the latter occasionally followed the Republican tradition and allowed the men of a centuria to elect their own centurion. Although most centurions rose from the ranks, there are a few instances attested of young men who were directly appointed centurions on enlistment: these were mostly the sons of active or retired centurions.

Centurions were arguably the most important group of officers in the army, as they led the legions' tactical sub-units (cohorts and centuriae) in the field. In consequence, on becoming a centurion, a soldier's pay and prestige would undergo a quantum-leap. Centurions were paid far more than their men. The available evidence is scant, but suggests that, in the 2nd century, an ordinary centurion was paid 16 times the pay of a ranker. If so, the differential had widened dramatically since the days of the Punic Wars, when a centurion was paid just double the rate of a ranker i.e. was a duplicarius in imperial terms. By the time of Caesar, the standing of centurions had already greatly increased: in 51 BC, after an especially tough campaign during the Gallic War, Caesar promised his troops a bonus of 50 denarii per man, and 500 each to the centurions, indicating that a differential of 10 times was commonplace even in the late Republic.

Each legion contained 60 (later 59) centurions, ranked in an elaborate hierarchy. Each of the 10 cohorts was ranked in seniority, the 1st Cohort (whose centuriae, after about AD 80, were double-strength) being the highest. Within each cohort, each of its six centuriae, and thus of its commanding centurion, was likewise ranked. Within this hierarchy, three broad ranks can be discerned: centurions (centuriones ordinarii), senior centurions (centuriones primi ordinis or "first-rank centurions") and the legion's chief centurion (centurio primus pilus). Senior centurions included those in command of the five centuriae in the 1st Cohort and the centuriones pilus prior ("front-spear") centurions of the other nine cohorts (i.e. the centurions in command of the 1st centuria of each cohort, who many historians believe, was also in de facto command of the whole cohort).

All centurions, including the primus pilus, were expected to lead their units from the front, on foot like their men, and were invariably in the thick of any combat melee. As a consequence, their casualty rates in battle were often heavy. An example from Caesar's De Bello Gallico, during a battle against the Belgic tribes of northern Gaul (57 BC): "Caesar had gone to the right wing, where he found the troops in difficulties... All the centurions of the 4th cohort [of the 12th legion] were dead, and the standard lost; nearly all the centurions of the rest of the cohorts were either killed or wounded, including the chief centurion, P. Sextius Baculus, a very brave man, who was so disabled by serious wounds that he could no longer stand on his feet." Or again, in a later battle against Vercingetorix at Gergovia (52 BC): "Attacked from all sides, our men held their ground until they had lost 46 centurions..." In battle, centurions were also responsible for the security of their unit's standard, whose bearer, the signifer, stayed close to his centurion on the battlefield. The chief centurion was accompanied by the aquilifer and had the even weightier responsibility of protecting the legion's aquila (eagle-standard).

Centurions were also responsible for discipline in their units, symbolised by the vitis or vine-stick which they carried as a badge of their rank. The stick was by no means purely symbolic and was frequently used to beat recalcitrant rankers. Tacitus relates that one centurion in the army in Pannonia gained the nickname Da mihi alteram! ("Give-me-another!") for his propensity to break his stick over his men's backs and then shout at his optio to bring him a new one. Centurions often earned the hatred of their men, as shown during the great mutinies which broke out on the Rhine-Danube borders on the death of Augustus. In one legion, each centurion was given 60 lashes of the flail by the mutineers, to represent the legion's total number of centurions, and was then thrown into the Rhine to drown.

Outside the military sphere, centurions performed a wide range of administrative duties at a senior level, which was necessary in the absence of an adequate bureaucracy to support provincial governors. A centurion might serve as a regionarius, or supervisor of a provincial district, on behalf of the provincial governor. They were also relatively wealthy individuals, due to their high salaries. In retirement, they often held high civic positions in the councils of Roman coloniae (veterans' colonies).

However, in social rank, the great majority of centurions were commoners, outside the small senatorial and equestrian elites which dominated the empire. In the class-conscious system of the Romans, this rendered even senior centurions far inferior in status to any of the legion's tribuni militum (who were all of equestrian rank), and ineligible to command any unit larger than a centuria. This is probably the reason why a cohort did not have an official commander. (However, many historians believe that a cohort in the field was under the de facto command of its leading centurion, the centurio pilus prior, the commander of the cohort's 1st centuria). Until c. AD 50, centurions had been able to command auxiliary regiments, but the emperor Claudius restricted these commands to Knights. The only escape-route for centurions from this "class-trap" was to reach the highest grade of centurio primus pilus. On completing his single-year term of office, the chief centurion of each legion (i.e. some 30 individuals each year) was elevated to the Order of Knights by the emperor.

Normally, an outgoing primus pilus (known as a primipilaris) would be promoted to praefectus castrorum (quartermaster and third officer) of a legion or to prefect of an auxiliary regiment or to tribune of a Praetorian cohort in Rome. Beyond these posts, the senior command-positions reserved for knights were in theory open to primipilares: command of the imperial fleets and of the Praetorian Guard, and the governorships of equestrian provinces (most importantly, Egypt). But in practice, primipilares rarely progressed to these posts due to their age (unless they were in the minority of centurions directly appointed as young men). It would take a ranker a median of 16 years just to reach centurion-rank and probably the same again to reach primus pilus. Most primipilares would thus be in their 50s when elevated to the Order of Knights, and already eligible for retirement, having completed 25 years' service. (In contrast, hereditary knights would be appointed to military tribunates of a legion and command of auxiliary regiments in their 30s, leaving plenty of time to move on to the senior posts).

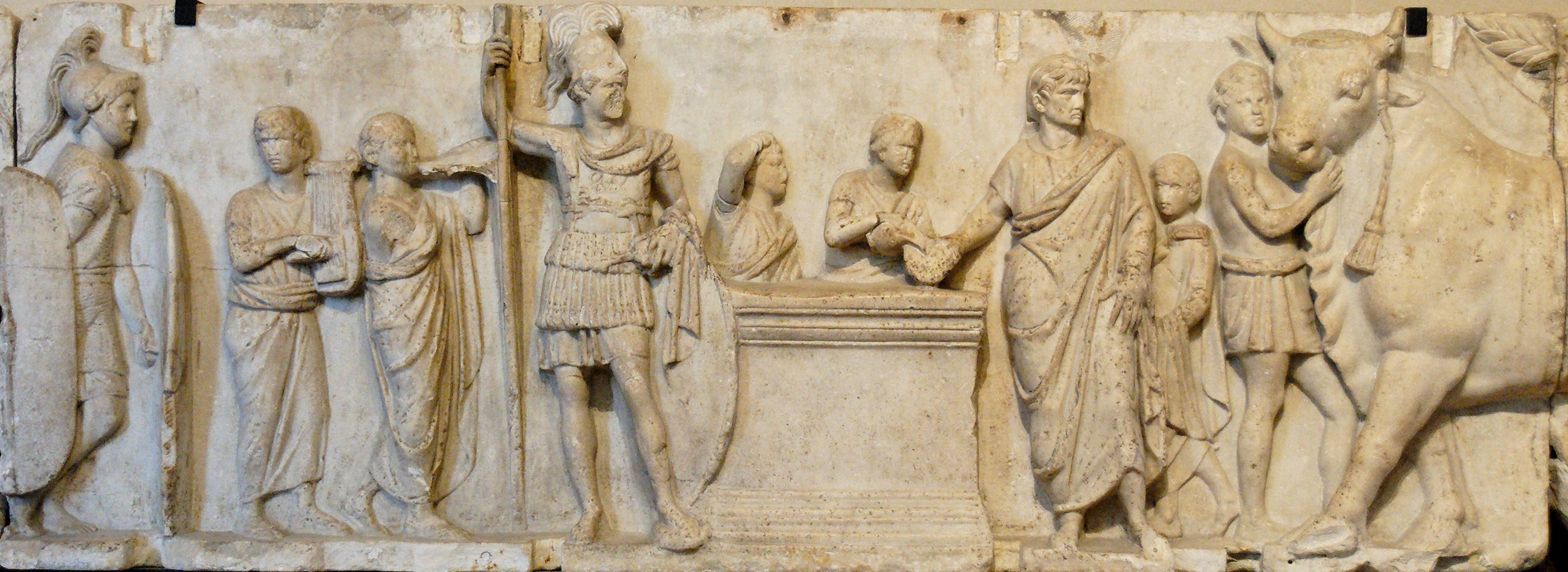
A Roman military tribune (centre) of the late Republic. Note the horse-hair plume on the helmet, bronze muscle cuirass, mantle, sash indicating knightly rank, pteruges. Detail from bas-relief on the Altar of Cn. Domitius Ahenobarbus, about 122 BC. Musée du Louvre, Paris

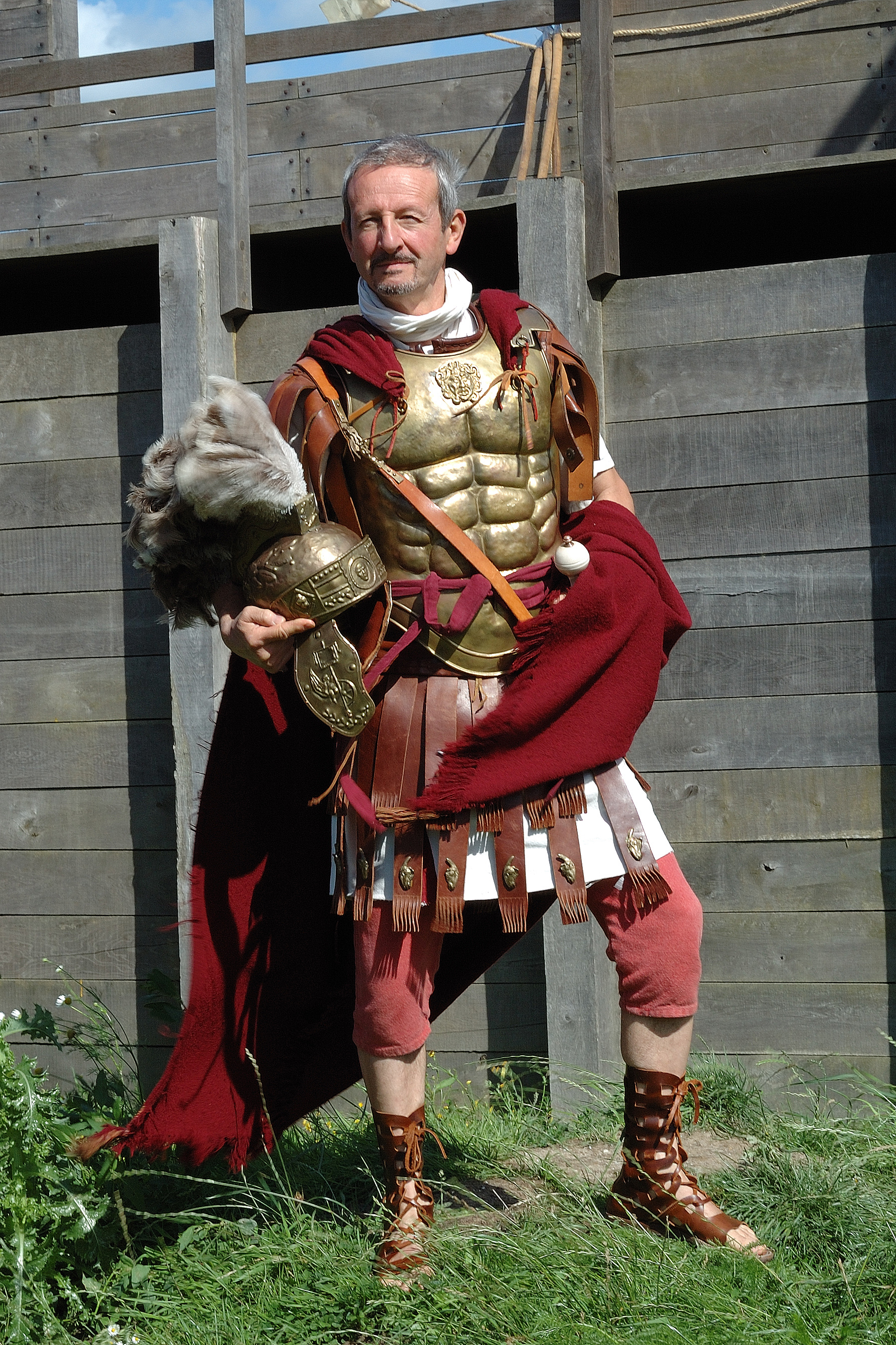
Modern re-enactor wearing replica equipment of a Roman military tribune of the imperial era. Note plumed, engraved helmet, bronze muscle cuirass, red mantle, red sash tied over cuirass indicating equestrian rank, pteruges. Under his tunic, the tribune wears the knee-length- riding-breeches worn by all mounted men to avoid chafing on the legs. The imperial tribune's equipment was virtually unchanged since Republican times (see above)

==== Tribuni militum ====
Each legion contained six senior officers, five of equestrian and one of senatorial rank, called tribuni militum ("tribunes of the soldiers"). The title "tribune" derives from the fact that in Republican days, they were elected by the Roman people's assembly (comitia centuriata) from the ranks of Roman knights. The elected officers would stand on the tribunal (dais). Originally the elected tribunes took turns to command their legion in pairs (see Roman army of the mid-Republic). Under Julius Caesar, command of legions became informally entrusted to single officers dubbed legati ("chosen ones") appointed by the proconsul, or governor, of the province in which the legions were stationed. This position was formalised under Augustus.

In the imperial army, the tribunes thus became staff-officers to the legatus. Formally, tribunes were entrusted with the legion's administration and paperwork, for which purpose they were each provided with a small personal staff of principales and military clerks (cornicularii). Tribunes' military role was apparently kept ill-defined and flexible, so as to provide the legion commander with a small group of senior officers to carry out special tasks. Tribunes could be asked to command detachments of one or more cohorts; command specialist units, such as a flotilla; lead special operations; supervise fortification projects or the collection of supplies. In a pitched battle scenario, the available evidence does not permit a clear picture of a tribune's role. For example, Caesar relates (57 BC): "Noticing that the 7th legion, which was nearby, was also under heavy pressure, Caesar ordered the military tribunes to gradually join together the two legions [the 7th and the 12th] and form a square formation, so that they could advance against the enemy in any direction." Or again (52 BC): "Caesar ordered the trumpeters to sound the retreat and the 10th legion, which was with him, immediately halted their advance. But the other legions did not hear the signal, as they were separated by a wide depression, although the legates and military tribunes did their best to hold them back, in accordance with Caesar's orders." This evidence is consistent with two possible battle-roles for tribunes. A tribune may have played a formal role in command of a sector of the legion's battle-line. Alternatively, tribunes may have accompanied the legatus around the field, ready to convey his orders to particular senior centurions, or to assume command of a particular sector of the line at the behest of the legatus. In either case, as Roman knights, tribunes would move around the battle-field on horseback, not on foot like the centurions, and they would generally remain outside the fray, in order to maintain a strategic overview of the field.

The legion's five equestrian tribunes were known as angusticlavii ("narrow-banded", from the stripes a Roman knight was entitled to wear on his tunica, which was narrower than a senator's). They differed from their senatorial colleague, the laticlavius ("broad-banded"), in age, rank and experience. Before embarking on their military service (tres militiae), their normal cursus honorum required them to perform the full range of administrative and religious posts in the council of their home city. Minimum-age limits for such posts implied that they would be at least 30 before starting the tres militiae. By the time they became tribune of a legion, they would already have led an auxiliary cohort for three or four years, giving them substantial command experience.

There is no evidence regarding the pay of military tribunes. But since they ranked on a level with the commanders of auxiliary regiments, who were paid c. 50 times more than rankers, it is safe to assume that tribunes were paid a similar multiple of legionary's pay. Tribunes' pay would in any case have fallen somewhere between the 16-multiple of centurions and the 70-multiple of legati.

==== Praefectus castrorum ====
The legion's third officer was the praefectus castrorum ("prefect of the camp"), a post mostly filled by former chief centurions. These would typically be in their 50s, having earned their equestrian status by a lifetime of experience at the sharp end of legionary activity. Officially, the role of the praefectus was, as the title implies, that of camp quartermaster, in charge of the legion's headquarters and supplies. But with their enormous experience, the praefectus role extended much further, to acting as executive officer to the legatus, advising on all manner of military operations. In the absence of the legatus, the praefectus would normally deputise for him, under the nominal command of the laticlavius. From the time of Gallienus (r. 253–268 AD), these officers were routinely placed in command of their legion.

==== Tribunus laticlavius ====
The legate's nominal second-in-command was the single military tribune of senatorial rank attached to the legion, the laticlavius (literally: "broad-banded", referring to the wide stripe men of senatorial rank wore on their tunica). Typically the son of a senator (sometimes the legate's own son), and aged in his early twenties, he was performing his military service before seeking election as quaestor and thereby gaining a seat in the Senate (for which the minimum age was 25 years). His lack of military experience did not prevent him leading important combat missions. In the highly status-conscious Roman social system, his high birth would have commanded the automatic respect of even the most experienced commoner.

==== Legatus legionis ====
The commander of an imperial legion was known as the legatus legionis. He was typically a senator of praetorian rank i.e. he had held the post of praetor, implying that he would normally be in his mid-30s. His military experience would be limited to that gained as serving in his early twenties as tribunus laticlavius. As a consequence, he would rely heavily on the advice of his enormously experienced praefectus castrorum. The evidence suggests that a legatus would be paid c. 70 times a ranker's salary.

=== Auxiliary officers ===
==== Principales ====
An auxiliary regiment's junior officers appear broadly the same as in the legions. These were, in ascending order: tesserarius, optio, signifer (standard-bearer for the centuria). However, auxiliary regiments also attest a custos armorum ("keeper of the armoury"), on pay-and-a-half. The vexillarius, bore the regiment's standard, on double-pay. In addition, the turma of an ala appear to have contained a curator on double-pay, ranking just below decurion, apparently in charge of horses and caparison.

==== Praefecti auxiliorum ====
In the early Julio-Claudian period, the commanders of the auxiliary units (praefecti auxiliorum) were often senior centurions and so ranked below the legionary tribunes. The position changed under Claudius, who restricted command of auxiliary regiments to men of equestrian rank. Furthermore, an equestrian military cursus honorum became established, known as the tres militiae ("three commands"), each held for 3–4 years: command of an auxiliary cohort, followed by military tribune of a legion, followed by command of an ala. These reforms had the effect of elevating praefecti to the same rank as legionary tribunes. Under Hadrian, a fourth militia, command of a double-strength ala milliaria was established for especially proficient officers.

It appears that in the 2nd century, the majority of auxiliary prefects were still of Italian origin. In contrast, the evidence for the 3rd century is that Italians provided less than a third of prefects.

The pay of a praefectus of an auxiliary regiment in the early 2nd century has been estimated at over 50 times that of a miles (common soldier). (This compares to a full colonel in the British Army, who is currently paid about five times a private's salary). The reason for the huge gap between the top and the bottom of the pyramid is that Roman society was far more hierarchical than a modern one. A praefectus was not just a senior officer. He was also a Roman citizen (which most of his men were not) and, as a member of the equestrian order, an aristocrat. The social gulf between the praefectus and a peregrinus soldier was thus immense, and the pay differential reflected that fact.

== Identity ==
=== Unit names and numbers ===
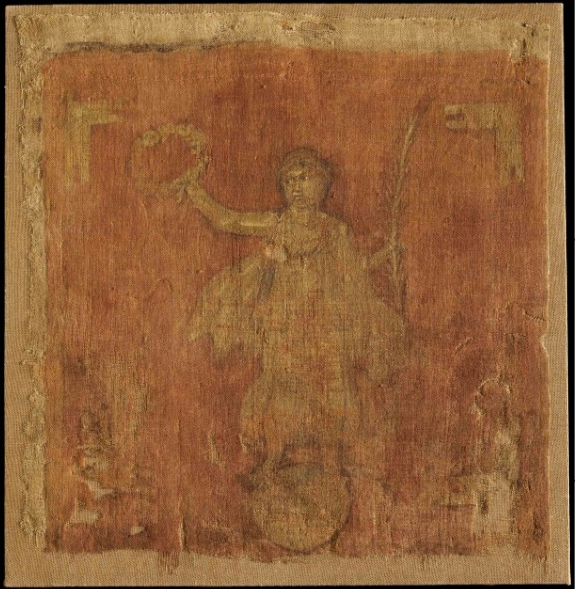
The only extant Roman vexillum, 3rd century AD. Pushkin Museum of Fine Arts, Russia.

The numbering of the legions is confusing, due to duplicated and inconsistent numeration by various emperors. Several legions shared the same serial number with others. Augustus numbered the legions he founded himself from I, but at the same retained the serial numbers of those legions he inherited from his predecessors. This policy was generally followed by those of his successors who also founded new legions (there were thus many legions numbered I). However, even this practice was not consistently followed. For example, Vespasian formed two new legions out of units disbanded in disgrace after the Civil War of 68–9, but gave them the same serial numbers (but different titles) as the disbanded ones. Trajan numbered the first legion he founded XXX because there were 29 other legions in existence at that time; but the second Trajanic legion was given the serial number II. XVII, XVIII and XIX, the numbers of the legions annihilated in the Teutoburg Forest, were never used again. (No titles are recorded in surviving ancient sources for these three legions, suggesting that their titles may have been deliberately suppressed due to their disgrace). As a result of this somewhat chaotic numeration, it became necessary to accord a title, as well as a serial number, to each legion in order to distinguish between legions with the same number. The geographical titles indicate (a) the country where a legion was originally recruited e.g., Italica = from Italy or (b) peoples the legion vanquished, e.g.,Parthica = victorious over the Parthians. Legions bearing the personal name of an emperor, or of his gens (clan) (e.g., Augusta, Flavia) were either founded by that Emperor or accorded the name as a mark of special favour.

The nomenclature of the great majority of auxiliary regiments followed a standard configuration: unit type (ala or cohors), followed by serial number, followed by name of the peregrini tribe (or nation) from whom the regiment was originally raised, in the genitive (possessive) plural case e.g., cohors III Batavorum ("3rd Cohort of Batavi"); cohors I Brittonum ("1st Cohort of Britons"). Some regiments combine the names of two peregrini tribes, most likely after the merger of two previously separate regiments e.g., ala I Pannoniorum et Gallorum ("1st Wing of Pannonians and Gauls"). A minority of regiments are named after an individual, mostly after the first prefect of the regiment e.g., ala Sulpicia (presumably named after a prefect whose middle (gens) name was Sulpicius). The latter is also an example of the minority of regiments that did not carry a serial number. After the tribal name, one or more epithets could be added, to further describe the regiment: equitata (infantry cohort with a cavalry contingent attached); sagittariorum (archer unit) etc.

=== Titles ===
Legions often carried several titles, awarded after successive campaigns, normally by the ruling emperor, e.g., XII Fulminata also boasted: paterna ("senior"), victrix ("victorious"), antiqua ("venerable"), certa constans ("reliable, steadfast") and Galliena ("(the emperor) Gallienus's favourite"). Pia fidelis ("dutiful, loyal"), fidelis constans and others were titles awarded to several legions, sometimes several times to the same legion.

Auxiliary regiments were often rewarded for meritorious service by the grant of an honorific title. The most sought-after title was the prestigious c.R. (civium Romanorum = "of Roman citizens"). In the latter case, all the regiment's members at the time, but not their successors, would be granted Roman citizenship. But the regiment would retain the c.R. title in perpetuity. Another common title was the gens name of the emperor making the award (or founding the regiment) e.g., Ulpia: the gens name of Trajan (Marcus Ulpius Traianus r.98–117). Other titles were similar to those given to the legions e.g., pia fidelis (p.f. = "dutiful and loyal").

=== Standards ===
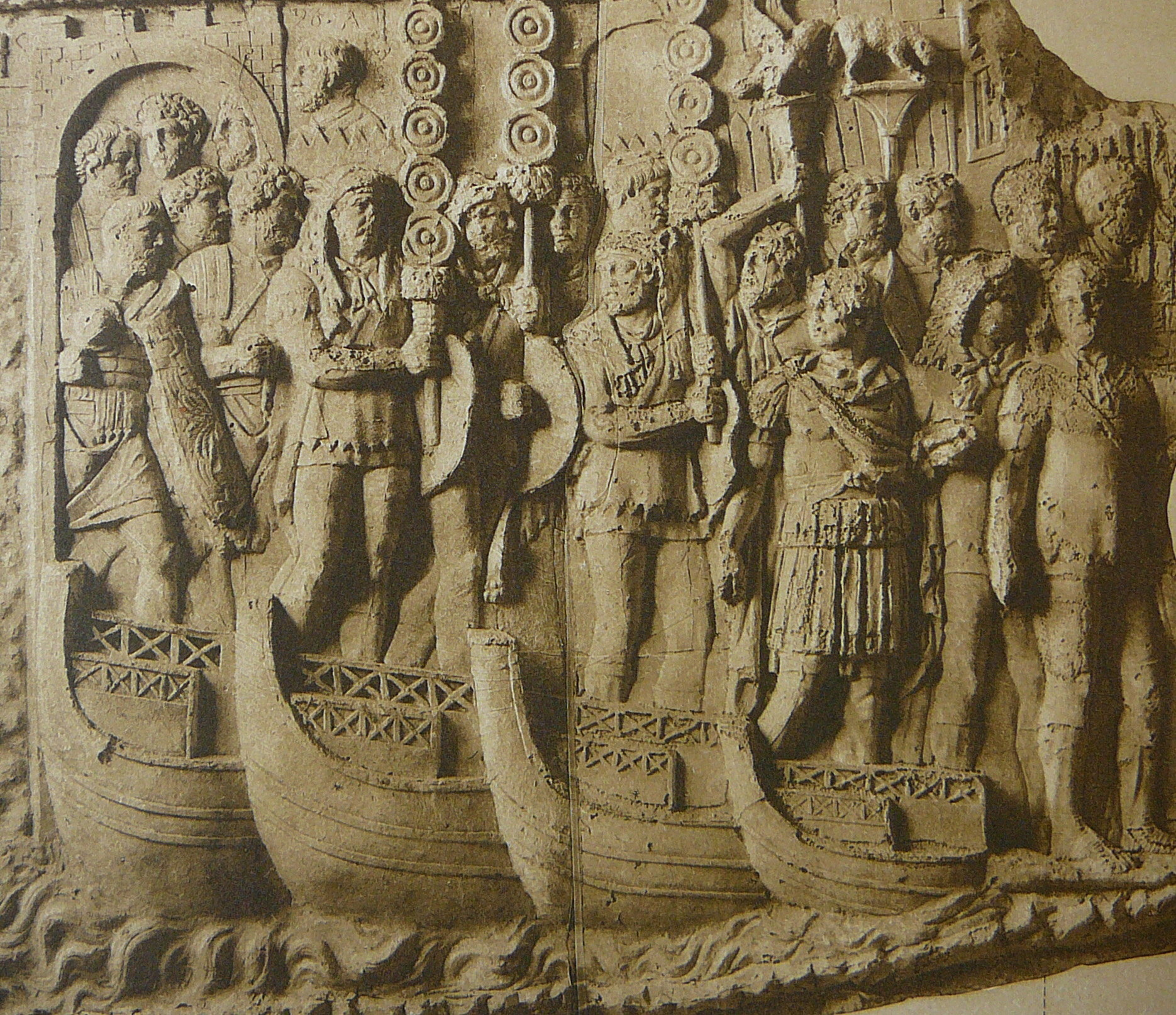
Roman military standards. The standards with discs, or signa (first three on left) belong to centuriae of the legion (the image does not show the heads of the standards - whether spear-head or wreathed-palm). Note (second from right) the legion's aquila. The standard on the extreme right probably portrays the She-wolf (lupa) which fed Romulus, the legendary founder of Rome. (This was the emblem of Legio VI Ferrata, a legion then based in Judaea, a detachment of which is known to have fought in Dacia). Detail from Trajan's Column, Rome

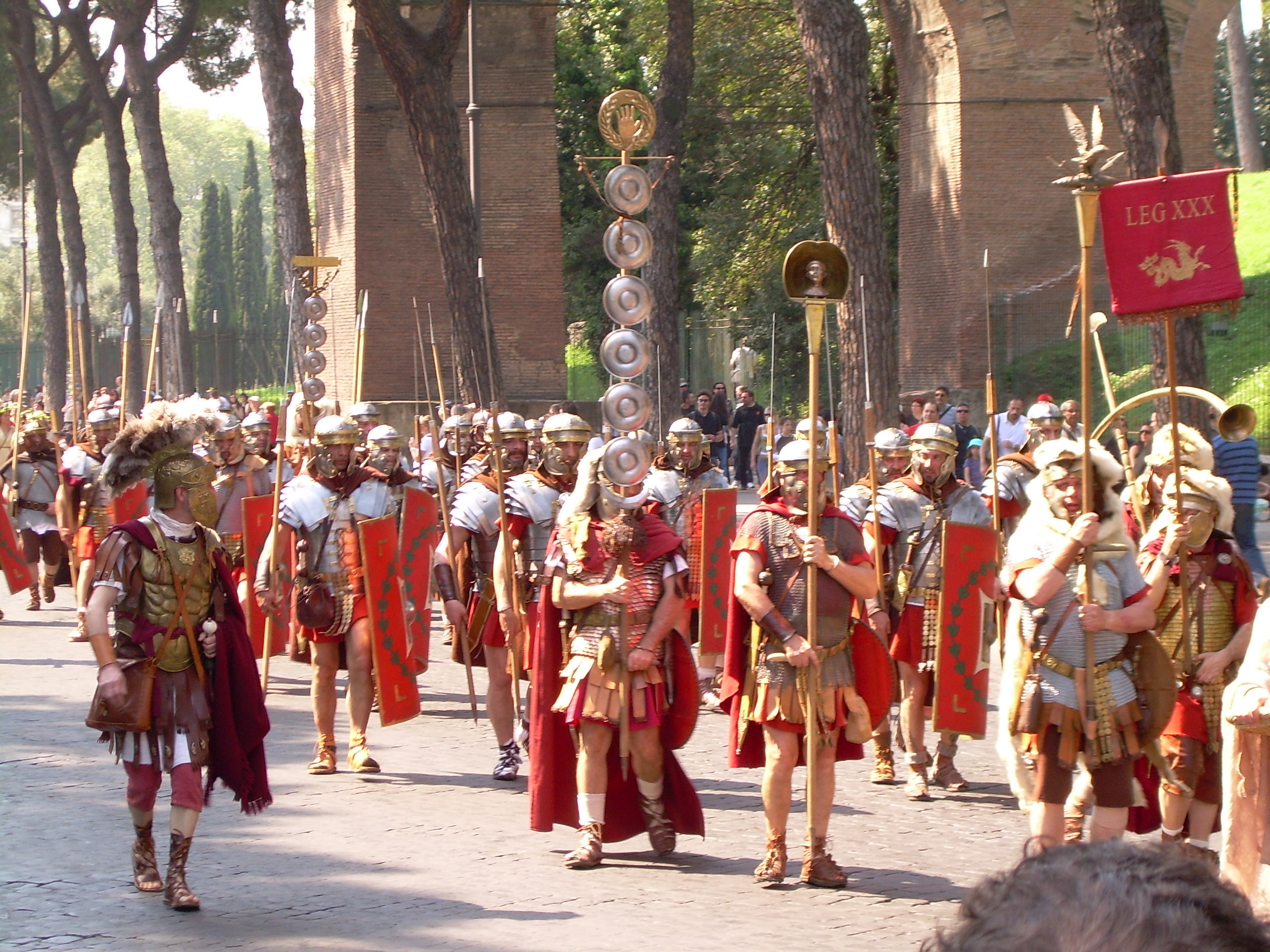
Modern reenactors parade with replicas of various legionary standards. From left to right: signum (spear-head type), with four discs; signum (wreathed-palm type), with six discs; imago of ruling emperor; legionary aquila; vexillum of commander (legatus) of Legio XXX Ulpia Victrix, with embroidered name and emblem (Capricorn) of legion

Each tactical unit in the imperial army, from centuria upwards, had its own standard. This consisted of a pole with a variety of adornments that was borne by dedicated standard-bearers who normally held the rank of duplicarius. Military standards had the practical use of communicating to unit members where the main body of the unit was situated, so that they would not be separated, in the same way that modern tour-group guides use umbrellas or flags. But military standards were also invested with a mystical quality, representing the divine spirit (genius) of the unit and were revered as such (soldiers frequently prayed before their standards). The loss of a unit's standard to the enemy was considered a terrible stain on the unit's honour, which could only be fully expunged by its recovery.

The standard of a centuria was known as a signum, which was borne by the unit's signifer. It consisted of a pole topped by either an open palm of a human hand or by a spear-head. The open palm, it has been suggested, originated as a symbol of the maniple (manipulus = "handful"), the smallest tactical unit in the Roman army of the mid-Republic. The poles were adorned with two to six silver discs (the significance of which is uncertain). In addition, the pole would be adorned by a variety of cross-pieces (including, at bottom, a crescent-moon symbol and a tassel). The standard would also normally sport a cross-bar with tassels.

The standard of a Praetorian cohort or an auxiliary cohort or ala was known as a vexillum or banner. This was a square flag, normally red in colour, hanging from a crossbar on the top of the pole. Stitched on the flag would be the name of the unit and/or an image of a god. An exemplar found in Egypt bears an image of the goddess Victory on a red background. The vexillum was borne by a vexillarius. A legionary detachment (vexillatio) would also have its own vexillum. Finally, a vexillum traditionally marked the commander's position on the battlefield. The exception to the red colour appears to have been the Praetorian Guard, whose vexilla, similar to their clothing, favoured a blue background.

From the time of Marius (consul 107 BC), the standard of all legions was the aquila ("eagle"). The pole was surmounted by a sculpted eagle of solid gold, or at least gold-plated silver, carrying thunderbolts in its claws (representing Jupiter, the highest Roman god. Otherwise the pole was unadorned. No exemplar of a legionary eagle has ever been found (doubtless because any found in later centuries were melted down for their gold content). The eagle was borne by the aquilifer, the legion's most senior standard-bearer. So important were legionary eagles as symbols of Roman military prestige and power, that the imperial government would go to extraordinary lengths to recover those captured by the enemy. This would include launching full-scale invasions of the enemy's territory, sometimes decades after the eagles had been lost e.g., the expedition in 28 BC by Marcus Licinius Crassus against Genucla (Isaccea, near modern Tulcea, Rom., in the Danube delta region), a fortress of the Getae, to recover standards lost 33 years earlier by Gaius Antonius, an earlier proconsul of Macedonia. Or the campaigns of AD 14–17 to recover the three eagles lost by Varus in AD 6 in the Teutoburg Forest.

Under Augustus, it became the practice for legions to carry portraits (imagines) of the ruling emperor and his immediate family members. An imago was usually a bronze bust carried on top of a pole like a standard by an imaginifer.

From around the time of Hadrian (r. 117–38), some auxiliary alae adopted the dragon-standard (draco) commonly carried by Sarmatian cavalry squadrons. This was a long cloth wind-sock attached to an ornate sculpture of an open dragon's mouth. When the bearer (draconarius) was galloping, it would make a strong hissing-sound.

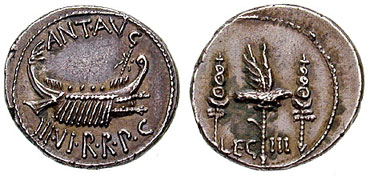
Denarius minted by Mark Antony to pay his legions. On the reverse, the aquila of his Third legion.

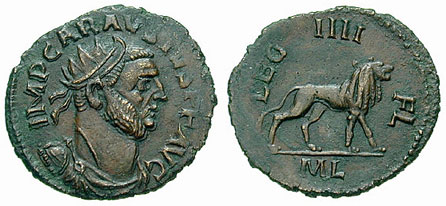
Antoninianus minted under Carausius. On the reverse, the lion, symbol of the Legio IV Flavia Felix, and the legend LEG IIII FL.

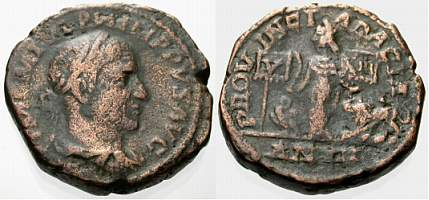
Sestertius minted in 248 by Philip the Arab to celebrate the province of Dacia and its legions, V Macedonica and XIII Gemina. Note the eagle symbol on the reverse of legio V [left]

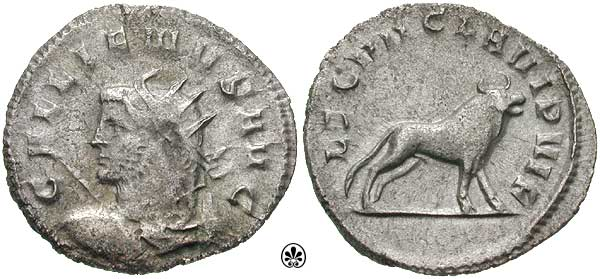
Gallienus coin, celebrating LEG VII CLA VI P VI F (Seventh legion Claudia, six times faithful, six times loyal), and bearing the bull, symbol of the Legio VII Claudia, on the reverse.

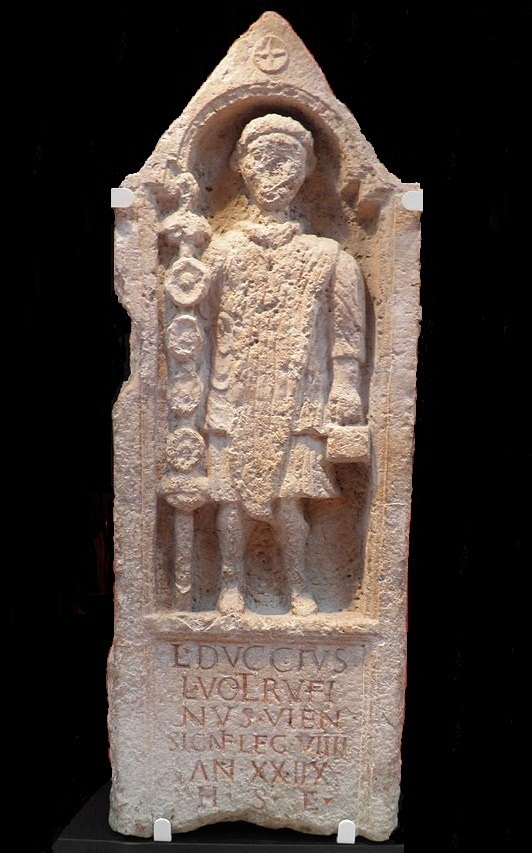
Memorial to Lucius Duccius Rufinus, a standard bearer of the Legio IX Hispana, Yorkshire Museum, York

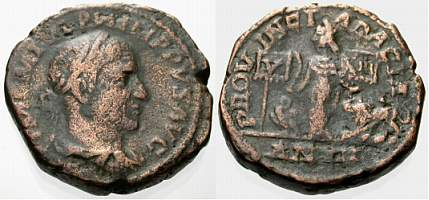
Sestertius minted in 248 by Philip the Arab to celebrate the province of Dacia and its legions, V Macedonica and XIII Gemina. Note the lion, symbol on the reverse of the legio XIII (right).

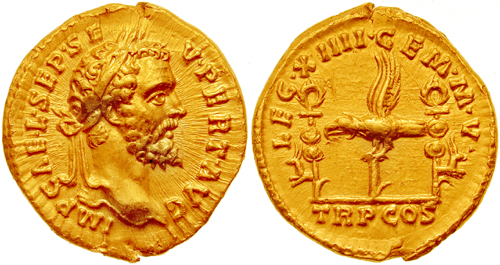
Aureus minted in 193 by Septimius Severus, to celebrate XIIII Gemina Martia Victrix, the legion that proclaimed him emperor. Legion emblem was the Capricorn.

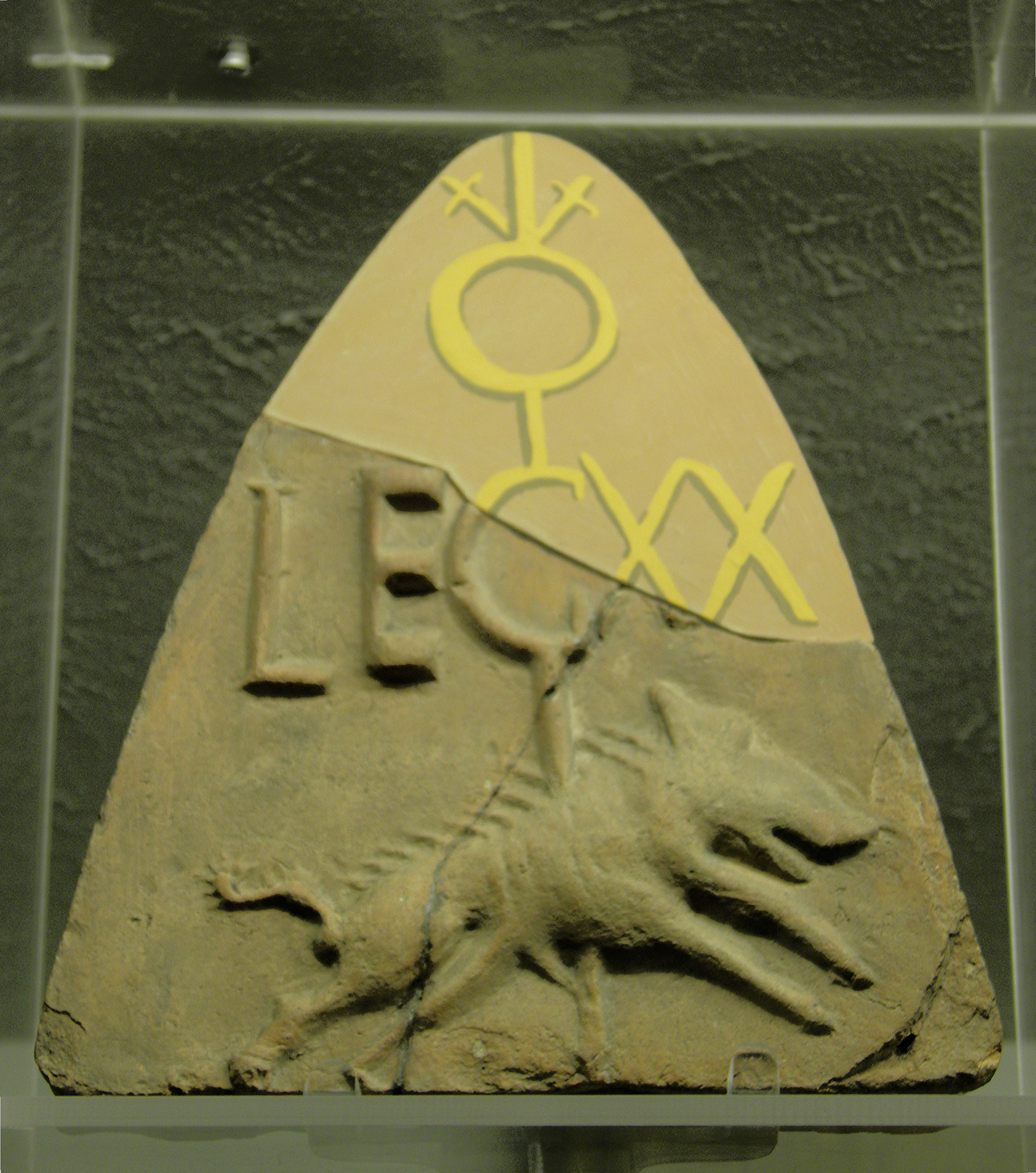
Emblem of the 20th Legion Roof Tile

=== Decorations ===
The Roman army awarded a variety of individual decorations (dona) for valour to its legionaries. Hasta pura was a miniature gold spear; phalerae were large medal-like bronze or silver discs worn on the cuirass; armillae were bracelets worn on the wrist; and torques were worn round the neck, or on the cuirass. The highest awards were the coronae ("crowns"), of which the most prestigious was the corona civica, a crown made oak-leaves awarded for saving the life of a fellow Roman citizen in battle. The most valuable award was the corona muralis/vallaris, a crown made of gold awarded to the first man to scale an enemy wall/rampart. This was awarded rarely, as such a man hardly ever survived.

There is no evidence that auxiliary common soldiers received individual decorations like legionaries, although auxiliary officers did. Instead, the whole regiment was honoured by a title reflecting the type of award, e.g., torquata ("awarded a torque") or armillata ("awarded bracelets"). Some regiments would, in the course of time, accumulate a long list of titles and decorations e.g. cohors I Brittonum Ulpia torquata pia fidelis c.R..

== Equipment ==
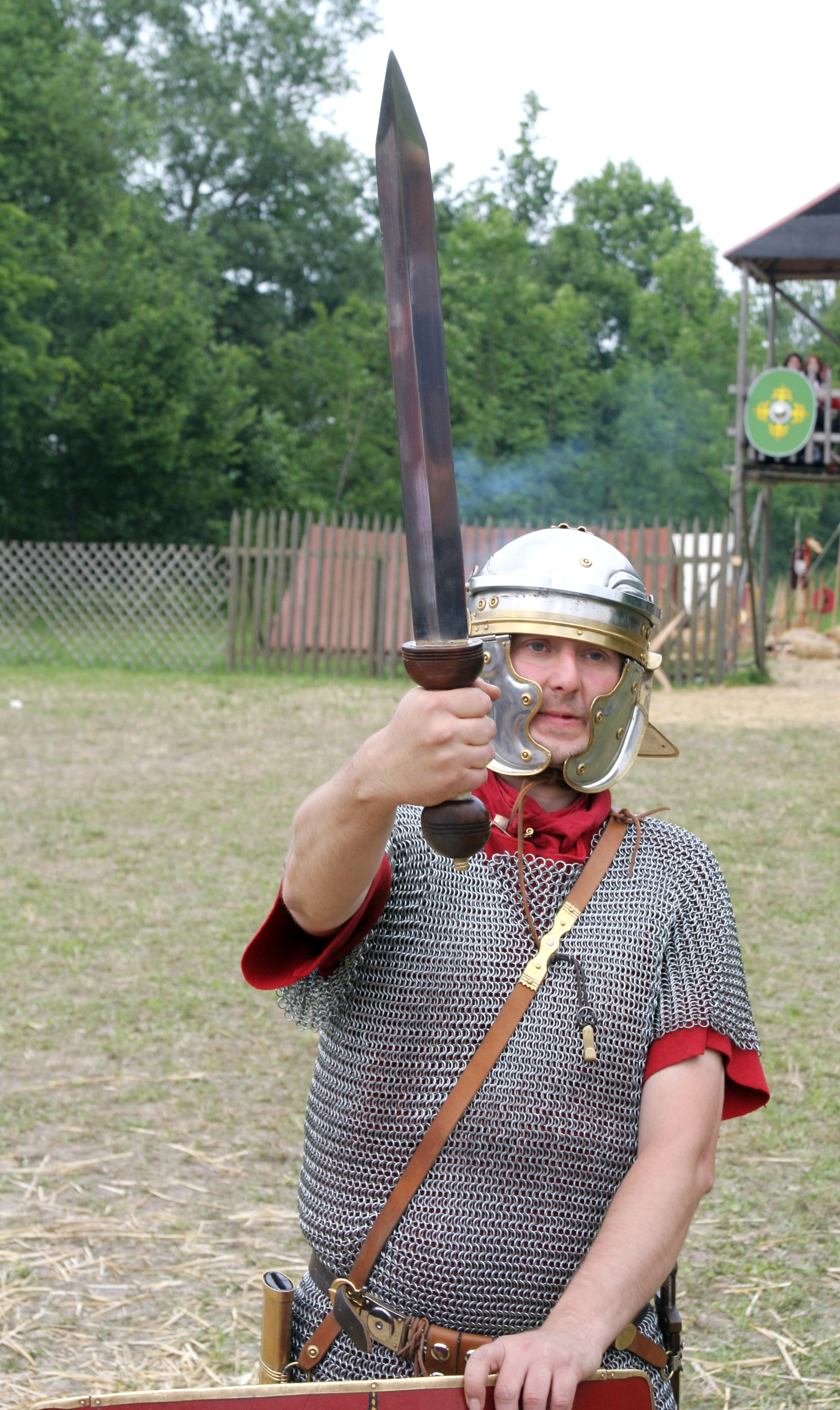
Historical re-enactor showing a replica Pompeii-Type Gladius. He is also wearing replica equipment of late 1st-century legionary, including the lorica hamata.

The basic equipment of an imperial foot-soldier was essentially the same as in the manipular Roman army of the Republic: metal armour cuirass, metal helmet, shield and sword. However, new equipment – the lorica segmentata and the rectangular version of the scutum – was developed for legionaries, although apparently not made available to auxiliaries.

=== Weapons manufacture ===
In the 2nd century, there is evidence of fabricae (arms factories) inside legionary bases and even in the much smaller auxiliary forts, staffed mainly by the soldiers themselves. But, unlike for the Late Roman army of the 4th century onwards, there is no evidence, literary or archaeological, of fabricae outside military bases and staffed by civilians during the Principate (although their existence cannot be excluded, as no archaeological evidence has been found for the late fabricae either).

=== Armour ===
Lorica segmentata: Modern tests have shown that this lorica provided better protection to weapon-blows and missile-strikes than the other types of metal armour commonly used by Roman troops, mail (hamata) or scale (squamata), being virtually impenetrable by ancient weapons. However, historical re-enactors have found replicas of the lorica uncomfortable due to chafing and can generally only wear them for relatively short periods. It was also more expensive to manufacture and difficult to maintain due to its complex design of separate laminated strips held together by braces and hooks.

The bas-reliefs of Trajan's Column, a monument erected in 113 in Rome to commemorate the conquest of Dacia by Emperor Trajan (r. 98–117 AD), are a key source for Roman military equipment. Auxilia are generally shown wearing chain-mail or simple leather corslets, and carrying oval shields (clipei). Legionaries are depicted wearing lorica segmentata at all times (whether in combat or in other activities, such as construction) and with curved rectangular shields. But the figures in Trajan's Column are highly stereotyped, in order to distinguish clearly between different types of troops. On another Trajanic monument, the Adamclisi Tropaeum, the lorica segmentata does not appear at all, and legionaries and auxilia alike are depicted wearing either chain-mail or scales. There is general recognition that the Adamclisi monument is a more accurate portrayal of normality, with the segmentata used rarely, maybe only for set-piece battles and parades. It has been suggested that the lorica may have been used by auxiliaries also. But there is no firm evidence for this. Traces of this type of armour have been found in forts in Raetia from a time when no legions were stationed in the province. But these may simply have been left behind by legionaries on temporary detachment. Furthermore, auxilia are nowhere depicted wearing such armour.

The provision of more protective and expensive armour to legionaries was probably due to non-military reasons: the army was highlighting their social superiority, just as it did with higher pay. During the 3rd century, when all peregrini were granted citizenship, and therefore legionaries lost their social superiority, the lorica segmentata and the rectangular shield disappeared.

During the 3rd century, the segmentata appears to have been dropped and troops are depicted wearing chain mail (mainly) or scale, the standard armour of the 2nd century auxilia. Officers generally seem to have worn bronze or iron cuirasses, as during the Republic, together with traditional pteruges.

=== Helmets ===
In the Julio-Claudian era (30 BC – AD 69), it appears that soldiers continued to use the types of helmet used by the army of the Republic since about 250 BC: the Montefortino-type and Coolus-type. From about 70 AD onwards, these were replaced by more sophisticated designs, the so-called "Imperial Italic" and "Imperial Gallic" types. The aim of these innovations was to increase protection, whilst not obstructing the soldier's senses and mobility.

The "Imperial Gallic"- type which predominated from about AD 70 onwards, is a good illustration. The helmet features hinged cheek-guards covering the largest possible part of the face without restricting the soldier's breathing, sight and shouting-range. A horizontal ridge across the front of the bowl acted both as nose- (and face)-guard and as reinforcement against downward cuts on the bowl. Ear-guards protrude from the side of the helmet, but do not obstruct hearing. A shallow neck-guard was angled to the bowl to prevent chafing against the metal cuirass.

=== Shields ===
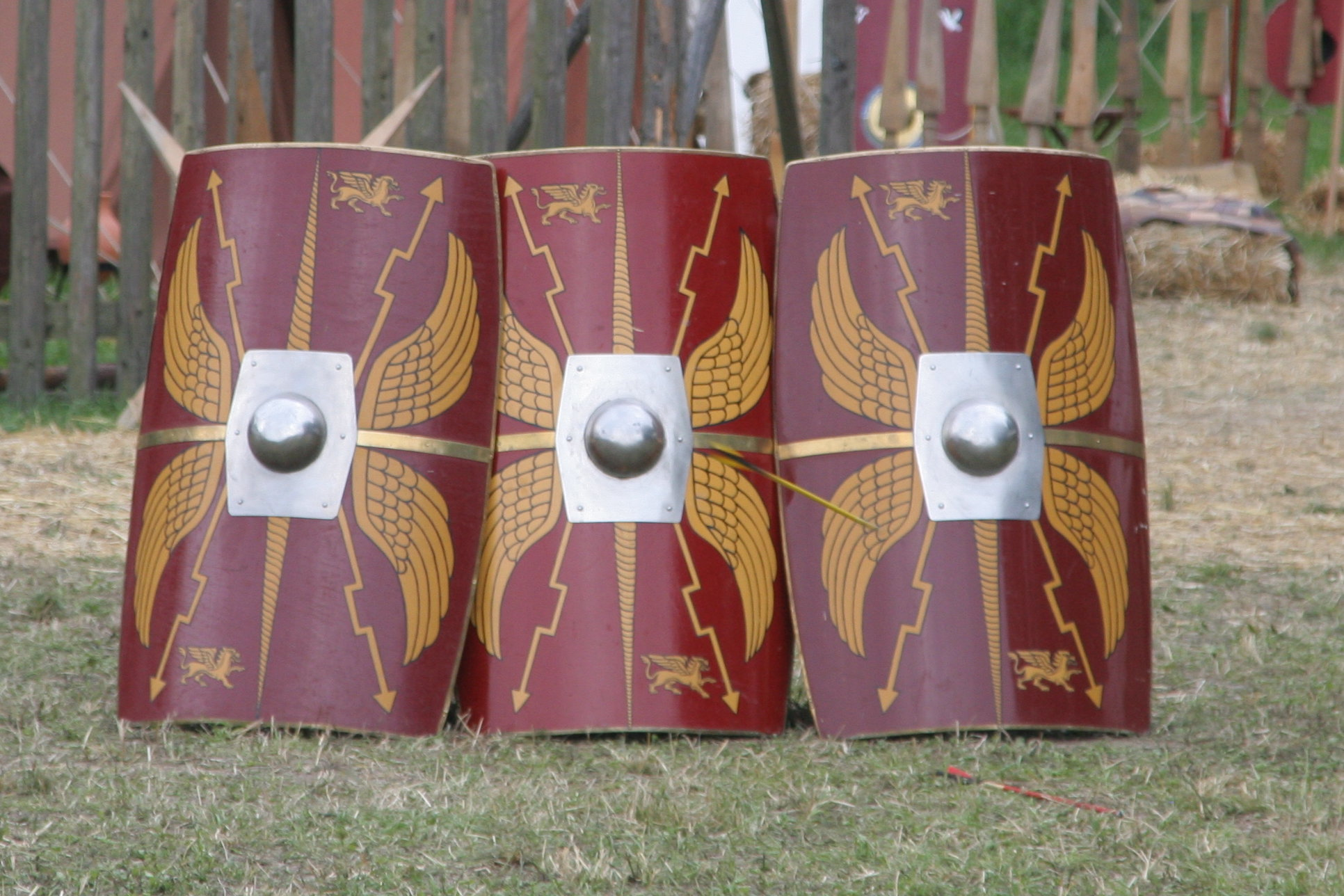
Scuta, as used by the Imperial Roman army's legions. Note the alae et fulgura ("wings-and-thunderbolts") emblem, painted exclusively on legionary shields and representing Jupiter, the highest Roman god

The legionary scutum (plural form: scuta; derivation: It. scudo, Sp. escudo, Fr. écu; Rom. scut), a convex rectangular shield, appeared for the first time in the Augustan era, replacing the oval shield of the army of the Republic. Shields, from examples found at Dura and Nydam, were of vertical plank construction, the planks glued, and faced inside and out with painted leather. The edges of the shield were bound with stitched rawhide, which shrank as it dried improving structural cohesion. It was also lighter than the edging of copper alloy used in earlier Roman shields.

The scutum disappeared during the 3rd century. All troops adopted the auxiliary oval (or sometimes round) shield (clipeus).

=== Hand weapons ===
The gladius hispaniensis (adopted by the Romans from an Iberian design, probably during the First Punic War (260-41 BC), was a short (median length: 450 mm) stabbing-sword that was designed for close-quarters fighting. It was standard for the Principate infantry (both legionary and auxiliary). The cavalry used the spatha (It. spada, French épée, Sp. espada, Rom. spada), a longer (median length: 760 mm) sword that allowed longer reach and easier swing. The Roman Legions also carried a small side arm called a pugio.

=== Missiles ===
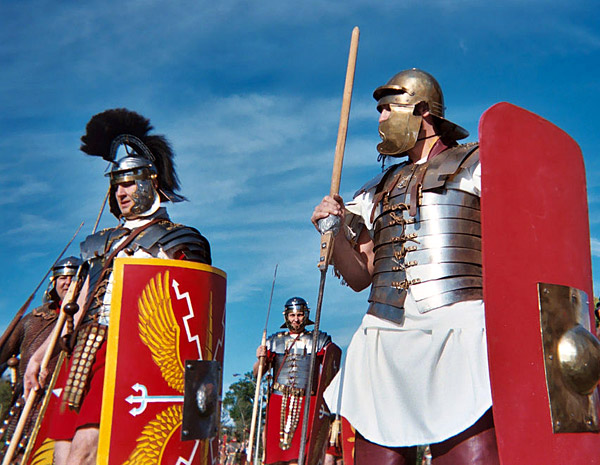
Re-enactors dressed as legionaries of the Imperial Roman army. They are carrying pila, the standard heavy javelin of the era.

Legionaries were equipped with the developed version of the pilum, a heavy javelin (throwing-spear) that had been used by Roman soldiers since around 250 BC. This weapon had lead counterweights to assist stability in flight and penetration; a barbed point to prevent withdrawal from flesh or shield; and a buckling shank to prevent it being thrown back. During the Republic, legionaries had been equipped with two of these, but now appear to have carried only one. Modern tests have shown the effective range of these javelins to be about 15 m. It appears that auxiliaries were not equipped with a pilum, but with a light spear.

Archers of the imperial army were equipped with the recurved composite bow as their standard. This was a sophisticated, compact and powerful weapon, suitable for mounted and foot archers alike (the cavalry version being more compact than the infantry's).

=== Clothing ===
In the 1st and 2nd centuries, a Roman soldier's clothes consisted of a single-piece, short-sleeved tunic whose hem reached the knees and special hob-nailed sandals (caligae). This attire, which left the arms and legs bare, had evolved in a Mediterranean climate and was not suitable for northern Europe in cold weather. In northern Europe, long-sleeved tunics, trousers (bracae), socks (worn inside the caligae) and laced boots were commonly worn in winter from the 1st century. During the 3rd century, these items of clothing became much more widespread, apparently common in Mediterranean provinces also. However, it is likely that in warmer weather, trousers were dispensed with and caligae worn instead of socks and boots.

== Strategy and tactics ==
=== Imperial expansion strategy ===
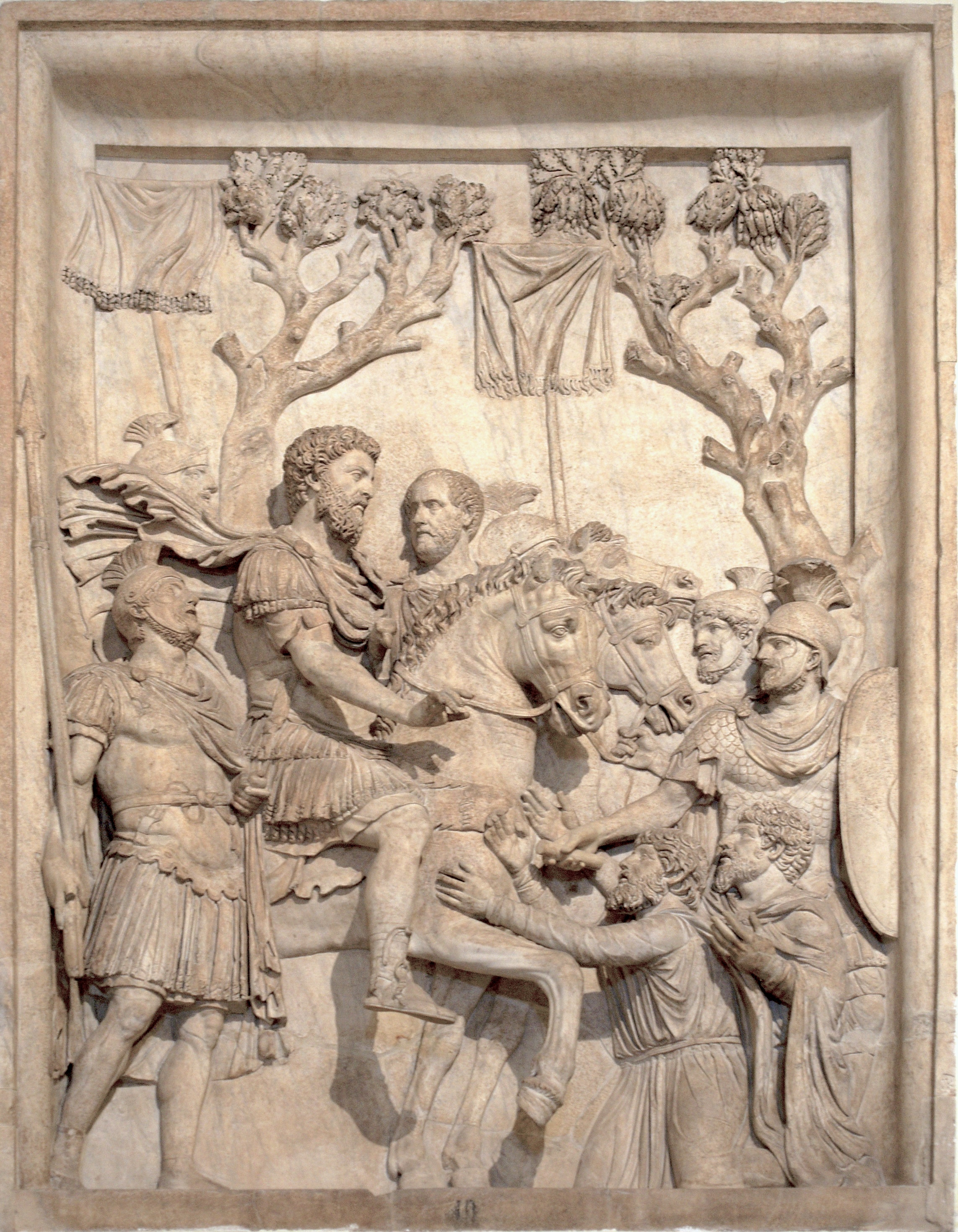
Emperor Marcus Aurelius (161–180 AD) shows his clemency towards the vanquished after his success against Germanic tribes; bas relief from the Arch of Marcus Aurelius, Rome, now in the Capitoline Museum

Under Augustus, the European borders of the empire he inherited from his grand-uncle Julius Caesar were considerably expanded. During the first half of his sole rule (27 BC – 14 AD), Augustus' central strategic objective was to advance the Roman border from Illyricum and Macedonia to the line of the Danube, Europe's greatest river, in order both to increase strategic depth between the border and Italy and to provide a major fluvial supply route for the Roman armies in the region. The strategy was successfully executed: Moesia (29–7 BC), Noricum (16 BC), Raetia (15 BC) and Pannonia (12–9 BC) were annexed in steady succession. After settling the Danube border, Augustus turned his attention to the North, where Julius Caesar had in 51 BC established the border of Roman Gaul along the river Rhine, the second major European fluvial route. Augustus launched an ambitious strategy of advancing the Rhine border to the river Elbe, aiming to incorporate all the warlike Germanic tribes. This would eliminate their chronic threat to Gaul, increase strategic depth between free Germans and Gaul, and make the western Germans' formidable manpower available to the Roman army. But a massive and sustained military effort (6 BC – AD 9) came to nothing. Roman advances in Germania Magna (i.e., Germany outside the empire) had to be scaled down during the Great Illyrian Revolt of AD 6–9, when many troops were diverted to Illyricum. Then Augustus' expansion strategy suffered a crushing setback when some 20,000 Roman troops were ambushed and massacred by the Germans at the Battle of the Teutoburg Forest in AD 9. After this, Augustus shelved his Elbe strategy. It was apparently revived briefly by his successor Tiberius, whose nephews, the generals Germanicus and Drusus, launched major and successful operations in Germania in AD 14–17, during which the main tribes responsible for Varus' defeat were crushed and the three lost legionary aquilae (eagle-standards) were recovered.

If Tiberius ever contemplated advancing the border to the Elbe, by AD 16 he had clearly abandoned the idea and decided to keep the border at the Rhine. Most likely, he assessed the Germanic tribes as too powerful and rebellious to incorporate successfully into the empire. After this, plans to annex western Germania were never seriously revived by Augustus' successors. Under the Flavian emperors (69–96), the Romans annexed the trans-Rhenane region they called the Agri Decumates, i.e., roughly the territory of the modern southwestern German state of Baden-Württemberg. But this acquisition was strictly aimed at shortening the lines of communication between the legionary bases of Germania Superior and Raetia provinces (Mainz and Strasbourg in Germania Superior and Augst and Regensburg in Raetia), by incorporating the salient between the upper reaches of the Rhine and Danube rivers. It was not part of a renewed effort to subdue Germany as far as the Elbe.

Doubtless mindful of the costly failure of his Elbe strategy, Augustus reportedly included a clause in his will advising his successors not to attempt to expand the empire further. In the main, this advice was followed, and few major permanent annexations were made for the duration of the Principate. The main exceptions were (a) Britain, which was invaded by the emperor Claudius in AD 43 and was progressively subdued (as far as the Tyne-Solway, line of the later Hadrian's Wall) in 43–78. However, the stiff, prolonged resistance offered by native tribes seemingly confirmed Augustus' warning, and reportedly led the emperor Nero at one stage to seriously consider withdrawing from Britain altogether; and (b) Dacia, conquered by Trajan in 101–6. In both cases, it appears that, apart from the emperors' self-glorification, the primary motivations were probably the target-countries' mineral resources and also to prevent those countries becoming bases for anti-Roman resistance in Gaul and Moesia respectively.

Apart from Britain and Dacia, other major territorial acquisitions by ambitious emperors were swiftly abandoned by their immediate successors, who took a more realistic view of the value and defensibility of the new possessions:

1. In Britain, governor Gnaeus Julius Agricola was in AD 79 apparently authorised by emperor Vespasian to launch the conquest of Caledonia, thus bringing the whole island under Roman rule. But in 85, by which time Agricola's troops had advanced as far north as Inverness, the project was apparently cancelled by the emperor Domitian, who needed reinforcements for the troubled Danube front. Agricola was dismissed and archaeology shows that the Romans abandoned the Scottish Highlands and withdrew to the Forth-Clyde isthmus; and that by 110, Roman forts in the Scottish Lowlands had also been evacuated, returning the border to the Tyne-Solway line. This prompted Agricola's son-in-law, the historian Tacitus, to comment that "the complete subjugation of Britain was achieved but immediately given up" (perdomita Britannia et statim missa). (Two further attempts to annex the Lowlands – by Antoninus Pius (r. 138–61), who built the Antonine Wall along the Forth-Clyde isthmus, and by Septimius Severus (r. 197–211), were likewise abandoned by their successors).
2. The Parthian province of Mesopotamia, annexed by Trajan in 116, was evacuated by his successor Hadrian in 118.
3. Hadrian also withdrew, by 126 (cf: the establishment of the Limes Transalutanus), from a large portion of Decebal's former Dacian kingdom, shortly after its conquest in 107 by Trajan: Moldavia, eastern Wallachia and the Banat (SE Hungarian Plain) were abandoned to Free Dacian and Sarmatian tribes. The most likely reason was that these regions did not possess significant mineral resources and were considered too difficult to defend.
4. Marcus Aurelius' reported plans to annex Sarmatia (i.e. the Hungarian Plain, which formed a salient between Roman Pannonia and Dacia, then under the control of the warlike Iazyges Sarmatian tribe) and Marcomannia (Bavaria/Austria north of the Danube, the territory of the Marcomanni and Quadi Germanic tribes) were only partially accomplished by the time the emperor died in 180 and even these gains were promptly abandoned by his son and successor Commodus.

The Rhine-Danube line thus remained the permanent border of the Empire in Europe for most of the Principate, with the exceptions of the Agri Decumates and Dacia. (Even these two salients were given up in the late 3rd century: the Agri Decumates were evacuated in the 260s and Dacia by 275. It appears that the Romans had exhausted the recoverable mineral wealth of Dacia and that both salients had become too expensive to defend). In the East, despite a certain amount of see-sawing in the disputed buffer-zone of Armenia, the long-term border with the Parthian empire was settled along the upper Euphrates River and the Arabian Desert. In North Africa, the Sahara Desert provided a natural barrier. As the borders became settled, the Roman army gradually mutated from an army of conquest to one of strategic defence, with long-term, fortified bases for the legions and strings of auxiliary forts along the imperial borders. The strategy adopted to ensure border security and the role required of the army by that strategy is discussed in Border security strategy, below.

In a different category are the Roman troops deployed to protect the Greek cities on the northern shores of the Black Sea (Pontus Euxinus). These cities controlled trade in the vital resources of the northern Black Sea region (principally grain from Sarmatia and metals from the Caucasus region). Pontic Olbia and the Roman client-states of the Bosporan kingdom and Colchis hosted Roman garrisons for much of the Principate era. But here the Romans relied on tame native monarchies rather than direct annexation. By this means, the Black Sea was turned into a Roman "lake" inexpensively.

=== Border security strategy ===
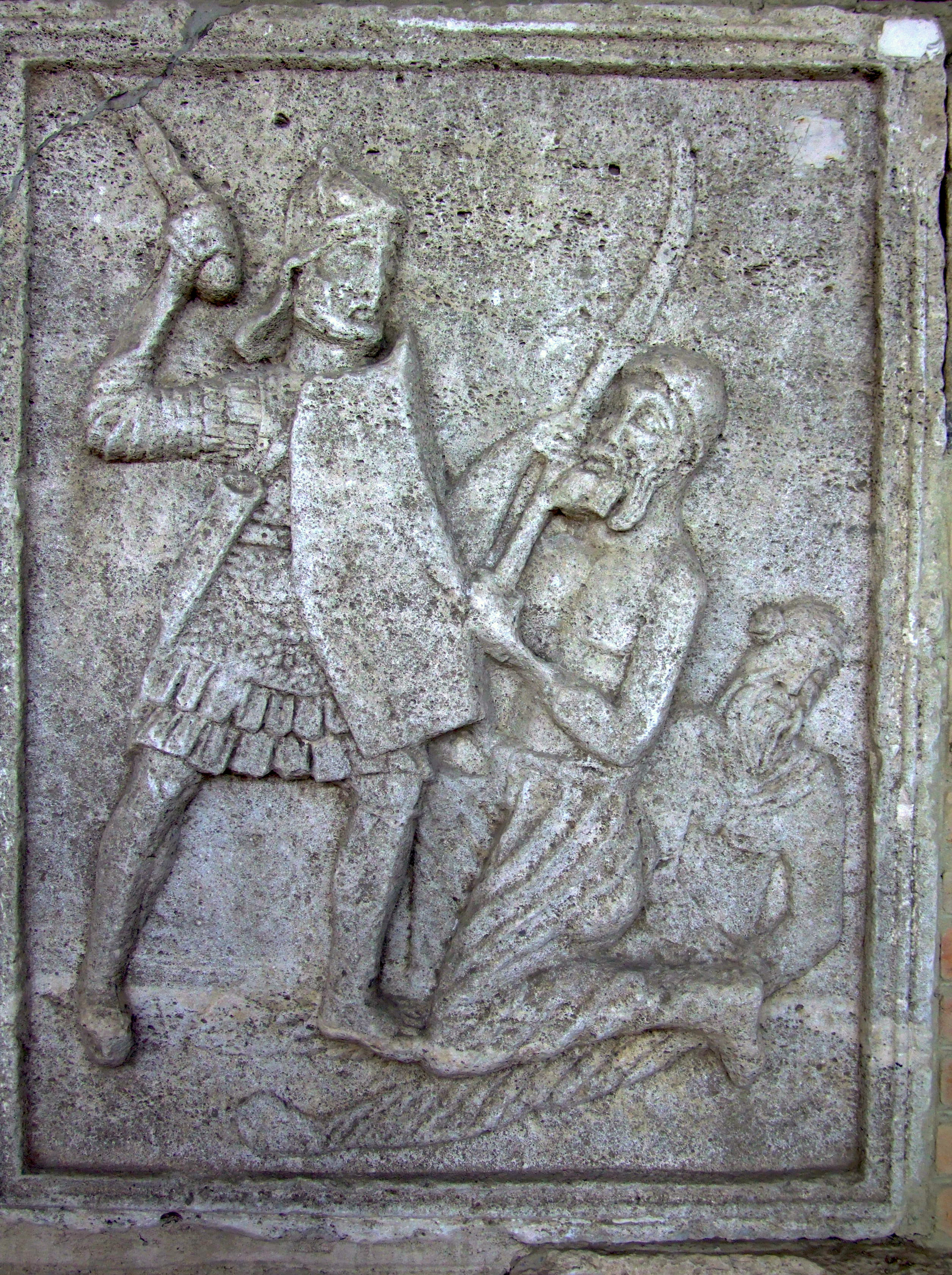
A metope raised relief of the Tropaeum Traiani (2nd century) showing a soldier of the Legio XX Valeria Victrix wearing laminar armor, the manica, and armed with a sword while fighting a Dacian, who wields a falx

According to Theodor Mommsen, the imperial Roman army relied on a "forward" or "preclusive" defence strategy, a view generally accepted by modern scholarship: cf. Edward Luttwak's Grand Strategy of the Roman Army (1977). Forward-defence aimed at neutralizing imminent barbarian incursions before they reached the imperial borders. This was achieved by stationing units (both legions and auxilia) on or near the border. Luttwak argued that annexations such as the Agri Decumates and Dacia were aimed at providing the Roman Army with "strategic salients", which could be used to attack enemy formations from more than one direction, although this has been doubted by some scholars. According to Luttwak, the Roman response to any threat would be a pincer movement into barbarian territory: large infantry and cavalry forces from the border bases would immediately cross the border to intercept the coalescing enemy army; simultaneously the enemy would be attacked in the rear by elite Roman cavalry (alae) advancing from the strategic salient(s). In any event, forward-defence obviously required the army to maintain first-rate and timely intelligence of events in the barbarian borderlands, which was provided by a system of small forts and fortified watch-towers in the cross-border regions, and by continuous cross-border patrols and scouting-operations (explorationes).

Forward defence was buttressed by imperial diplomacy, which was guided by two general strategies: firstly, preventing and breaking up large confederations of bordering barbarian tribes under powerful and charismatic native leaders, who could threaten imperial hegemony and border security, e.g., Arminius of the Cherusci, Maroboduus of the Marcomanni and Decebalus of the Dacians i.e. the strategy of divide et impera ("divide and rule"). The demise of charismatic barbarian leaders was achieved by supporting rival candidates for the leadership with money and/or direct intervention; encouraging constituent or neighbouring tribes of the confederation to attack the leaders' own core tribe; and full-scale invasion by Roman forces. Secondly, coercing all bordering native tribes into treaties of mutual assistance with Rome. Although the conditions of these treaties might vary considerably, they all contained the same core bargain: the Romans would promise to help defend the ally from attack by its neighbours; in return, the ally would promise to refrain from raiding imperial territory, and to prevent other tribes from the ally's hinterland from crossing its territory to do the same. Neighbouring barbarian peoples were thus used as the empire's first line of defence. In many cases, the loyalty of the ally would need to be reinforced by gifts or regular subsidies. In some cases, the Romans would assume a loose suzerainty over the tribe, in effect dictating the choice of new chiefs. These practices were applied on all the frontiers: Germans along the Rhine, Sarmatians along the Danube, Armenian kings and Caucasian and Saracen tribes on the Eastern frontier and Mauri in North Africa. Recalcitrant tribes which resisted inclusion in this client-state system (or attempted to break away from it, e.g., by overthrowing a pro-Roman leader, as happened on frequent occasions) would suffer coercion in the form of punitive incursions by the Roman army, accompanied by scorched-earth tactics: the Romans would systematically ravage the tribe's crops and destroy its livestock and burn its villages until exhaustion and starvation forced the barbarians to come to terms.

The forward-defence strategy was highly successful in protecting the empire's borders until the late 2nd century. No barbarian invasions succeeded in penetrating far into Roman territory until the Marcomanni and Quadi in 167–8, the first to penetrate Italy since the Cimbri in 101 BC, reaching as far as Opitergium (Oderzo), near Venice (see Marcomannic Wars). In the 3rd century, barbarian invasions increased in frequency, culminating in the disastrous period 250–70, when large parts of the empire were repeatedly overrun by Germanic and Sarmatian tribes (see Third Century Crisis). The reasons for the breakdown of the defensive system are much debated. According to Luttwak, the forward defence system was always vulnerable to unusually large barbarian concentrations of forces, as the Roman army was too thinly spread along the enormous borders to deal with such threats. In addition, the lack of any reserves to the rear of the border entailed that a barbarian force that successfully penetrated the perimeter defenses would have unchallenged ability to rampage deep into the empire before Roman reinforcements could arrive to intercept them. Another factor was the empire's greater political instability in the 3rd century, Until AD 192, the tiny Italian-dominated senatorial oligarchy that monopolised military, political and economic power in the empire, and from whose ranks emperors were chosen, succeeded in maintaining a remarkable degree of political stability: the only major episode of civil strife was the Civil War of 68-9. But in the third century, power shifted to the so-called "military emperors", Illyrian and Thracian provincials of often humble backgrounds who rose to the throne through the ranks of the army: supreme power was no longer the preserve of the Italian aristocracy. This encouraged many successful generals to attempt to seize power: consequently the soldiers of the 3rd century spent as much time fighting against each other as against the barbarians.

=== Marching order and camps ===
It is during the mid- Roman Republic that emerged a central feature of Roman military practice, which was adhered to until at least c. AD 400 if not beyond: the fortified marching-camp (castra), whose earliest detailed description is provided by the Greek historian Polybius.

Roman troops would construct a fortified camp, with a standardised size and layout, at the end of each day's march. Most of their adversaries would rely on camping on defensible features (such as hilltops) or in places of concealment (such as in forests or swamps). Although this practice spared troops the toil of constructing fortifications, it would frequently result in camps often being situated on unsuitable ground (i.e. uneven, waterlogged or rocky) and vulnerable to surprise attack, if the enemy succeeded in scouting its location.

The advantages of fortified marching-camps were substantial. Camps could be situated on the most suitable ground: i.e. preferably level, dry, clear of trees and rocks, and close to sources of drinkable water, forageable crops and good grazing for horses and pack-animals. Properly patrolled, fortified camps made surprise attacks impossible and successful attacks rare – in fact, no case is recorded in the ancient literature of a Roman marching-camp being successfully stormed. The security afforded by fortified camps permitted soldiers to sleep soundly, while animals, baggage and supplies were safely corralled within its precinct. If the army engaged an enemy near a marching-camp, a small garrison of a few hundred men would suffice to defend the camp and its contents. In case of defeat, fleeing soldiers could take refuge in their marching-camp. e.g., after their disaster on the battlefield of Cannae (216 BC), some 17,000 Roman troops (out of a total deployment of over 80,000) escaped death or capture by fleeing to the two marching-camps that the army had established nearby, according to Livy.

The process of establishing a marching-camp would start when the general in command of an army determined the general area where the day's march would terminate. A detail of officers (a military tribune and several centurions), known as the mensores ("measurers"), would be charged with surveying the area and determining the best location for the praetorium (the commander's tent), planting a standard on the spot. Measured from this spot, a square perimeter would be marked out. Along the perimeter, a ditch (fossa) would be excavated, and the spoil used to build an earthen rampart (agger) on the inside of the ditch. On top of the rampart was erected a palisade (vallum) of cross-hatched wooden stakes with sharpened points. Within this precinct, a standard, elaborate plan was used to allocate space, in a pre-set pattern, for the tents of each of the various components of the army: officers, legionary infantry and legionary cavalry, auxiliary infantry and cavalry, and barbarian allies. The idea was that the men of each unit would know exactly in which section of the camp to pitch its tents and corral its animals. The construction of a marching-camp would take an army just a couple of hours, since most soldiers would participate and were equipped with picks and shovels for the purpose.

=== Battle tactics ===
What is known about the tactics of the Imperial Era is largely conjectural. There is no surviving manual that describes in great detail any tactics that were utilized in this period, nor are the existing accounts of battles particularly helpful due to vagueness.

When there were open field battles, the Roman usually made use of a multiple line system in order to have reserves available. Reserves were important factors in battle as the reinforcements both increased morale of those already in the front lines and also brought fresh troops to continue to push the enemy back. The leaders of the army rode behind the front line to see when and where to commit the reserves. They could reinforce wavering units to prevent a penetration in the main battle line or help a unit that was beating back the enemy make a breakthrough. This had to be done carefully as committing reserves too early would not achieve any progress, while tiring the troops engaged in prolonged fighting. Waiting too long to commit reserves could cause the first line to collapse and start spreading panic throughout the entire army.

Battles started with both lines marching towards each other to clash in hand-to-hand combat. In contrast with their foes, who often tried to demoralize their enemies with shouts and other loud noises, the Romans kept quiet as they marched toward their onrushing foes. When the opponents came within a range of about 10 to 15 meters, or 30 to 50 feet, each legionnaire would throw his pilum at the enemy formation and charge accompanied by loud shouts and cornu trumpets. The double shock of the sudden change in demeanor of the Romans and the volley of pila would often cause great damage to the enemy morale. If the Romans succeeded in breaking the enemy, they would aggressively pursue the fleeing army to inflict as many casualties as possible. This pursuit of the enemy was led by the cavalry. The idea was to force the enemy into submission or cause them to be fearful of future battles with the Romans.

=== Siege tactics ===
Large, open battles in the field were somewhat infrequent during this time. The armies were often occupied with counter-guerilla actions which led to a siege of the stronghold of the enemy. During sieges, the Roman Legions came to rely on missile power. This can be seen during the Jewish Revolt. In the siege of Jotapata in AD 68, Vespaianus or Vespasian was said to have at least 350 artillery pieces along with 7,000 auxiliary archers. He used these to bombard the enemy fortifications to start each day's attack. When Titus, Vespaianus' son, laid siege to the city of Jerusalem two years later, he reportedly had 700 pieces of artillery.

This multitude of missiles helped cover the legions advancing towards the walls of the besieged settlements. The famous testudo ("tortoise") formation was utilized to protect the advancing legions. This was done by having the front rank hold out their shields in such a way as to overlap the shields of the men next to them and protect most of the body. The ranks behind the first rank raised their scutum above their own head so that it covered the man in front of him. These shields overlapped those in front of them, creating a shield roof over the entire unit's head. The soldiers at the end of each rank held out their shield sideways to complete the shell of shields. This and other formations were used to assault walls.

== Everyday life ==
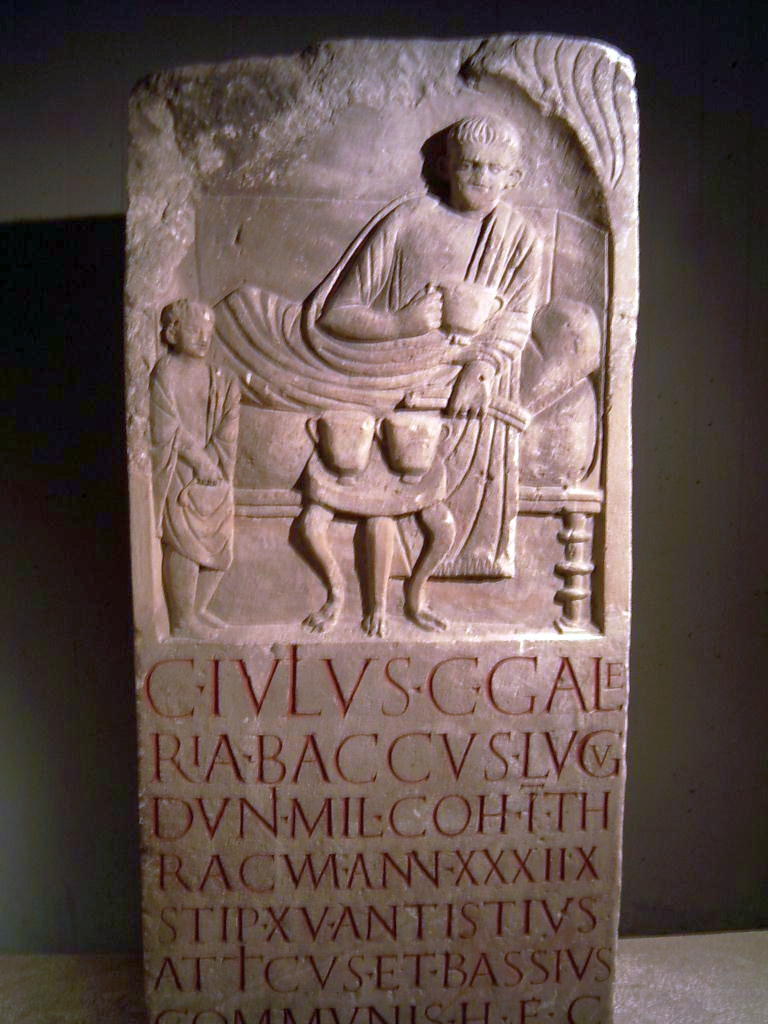
The tombstone of a Roman soldier shows him drinking wine at home

Soldiers generally spent only a fraction of their working lives on campaign. Most of their time was taken up with a wide range of other military and non-military duties.

=== Fort duties ===
Non-military duties on-site included the routine chores of fort life (cleaning, washing clothes and equipment, feeding horses and pack-animals) and working in the fort's fabrica (workshop where armour, weapons and other equipment were made and repaired). The army demanded high standards of personal hygiene and cleanliness from its troops, and provided them with the necessary sanitary facilities. Wells were excavated inside forts and aqueducts built to nearby springs to provide a continuous and plentiful supply of fresh, drinkable water. Latrines in the fort were continually flushed by gravity-flowing water, and elaborate drains and sewers would discharge the raw sewage into nearby streams and rivers.

An essential and burdensome activity was the procurement of the vast quantities of supplies that the regiment needed. For raw materials, the army purchased what it could locally, and imported the rest from elsewhere. The men of I Hispanorum veterana went as far afield (from Moesia Inferior) as Gaul to procure clothing and grain. For manufactured goods, the regiments would produce some of their needs themselves, e.g., evidence of leather-tanning and beer-brewing at Vindolanda and nearby Catterick fort. The tablets attest the procurement of cereals, beer, animal fodder; manufactured goods such as clothing, nails and vehicle parts; raw materials such as stone, iron, lead, timber, animal hides.

=== Military duties ===
Routine military duties included patrolling, guard-duty, and weapons training. These were not limited to the regiment's base fort and its vicinity only: the Vindolanda tablets show that detachments of the unit could be deployed in several different locations at once: one renuntia shows a detachment of nearly half the effectives of cohors I Tungrorum deployed at another fort. A papyrus renuntia for cohors I Hispanorum veterana equitata in Moesia Inferior (AD 105) reports a cavalry turma on a scouting mission (exploratum) across the Danube.

As in today's armies, each day would begin with a roll-call parade (probably called a numeratio). Soldiers were kept at a high level of physical fitness by daily exercises and 20-mile (32 km) marches typically every 10 days, as well as regular, full-scale training-manoeuvres and mock-skirmishes. The latter would often be inspected by a high military official: the legatus legionis, the provincial governor, or even the emperor himself. Some forts contained drill-halls, permitting all-weather training. Combat-training and exercises were a central part of a soldier's weekly routine. One tablet probably contains a scathing report by an officer (himself probably a Rhineland German) about the progress of young local trainee cavalrymen in the cohors equitata: "on horseback, too many of the pathetic little Brits (Brittunculi) cannot swing their swords or throw their javelins without losing their balance".

Parades were another important part of a regiment's routine. Occasional parades included religious rites and purely military parades such as the rosaliae signorum (decoration of the standards) and demissio, when veterans were discharged after completing their term of service and awarded their diplomas of Roman citizenship.

Communications between forts, legionary fortresses and the provincial capital were critical. Despatch-riders (dispositi), normally equites cohortales, were stationed at mutationes (road-side stations where horses could be changed) to form relays to carry messages rapidly. Relays of fresh riders and horses, careering at full gallop, could maintain an average speed of 20 miles per hour (32 km/h). Thus an urgent despatch from the legionary base at Eboracum (York) to the provincial governor's headquarters in London, a distance of 200 miles (300 km), a journey of about ten days for a single rider and mount, could be delivered in just ten hours. When messages were even more urgent, visual signals were used. Strings of signal-stations in prominent locations would transmit messages using parabolic mirrors during the day and fire by night.

=== Police duties ===
Off-site duties included many routine police and even administrative tasks. Provincial governors had only a minimal administrative staff at their disposal, and no regular police force. They therefore relied on their troops for many such duties, e.g., escorting the governor or other senior officials, patrolling highways, assisting and escorting tax collectors and military supply wagons, carrying official despatches, arresting wanted men. Thus a renuntia shows a detachment of 46 men of I Tungrorum on escort duty (singulares) with the provincial governor's staff.

Highways were routinely garrisoned and patrolled along their entire length. Small detachments of troops would be on duty at the way-stations: mutationes and mansiones (large wayside inns, with accommodation, stables, taverna and baths). These stations may well be the six unidentified locations where small detachments of c. 10 men, each under a centurion, were deployed according to a renuntia of cohors I Tungrorum. Troops on highway duty would check the identities and cargoes of road users as well as escort the vehicles of the cursus publicus (imperial transport service). This service was concerned with the transportation of official personnel and payloads: senior officials, tax revenues and wages for the troops, military supplies (usually conveyed in convoys of ox-drawn wagons) and official post. Such vehicles, especially the money-cars, were vulnerable to highway robbers, e.g., one eques (cavalryman) of I Hispanorum veterana was reported killed by robbers in a renuntia. Troops would also assist agents of the procurator (the senior financial official in the province) to collect the portorium, an imperial toll on the carriage of goods on public roads, payable whenever the goods crossed a toll-line.

=== Construction ===
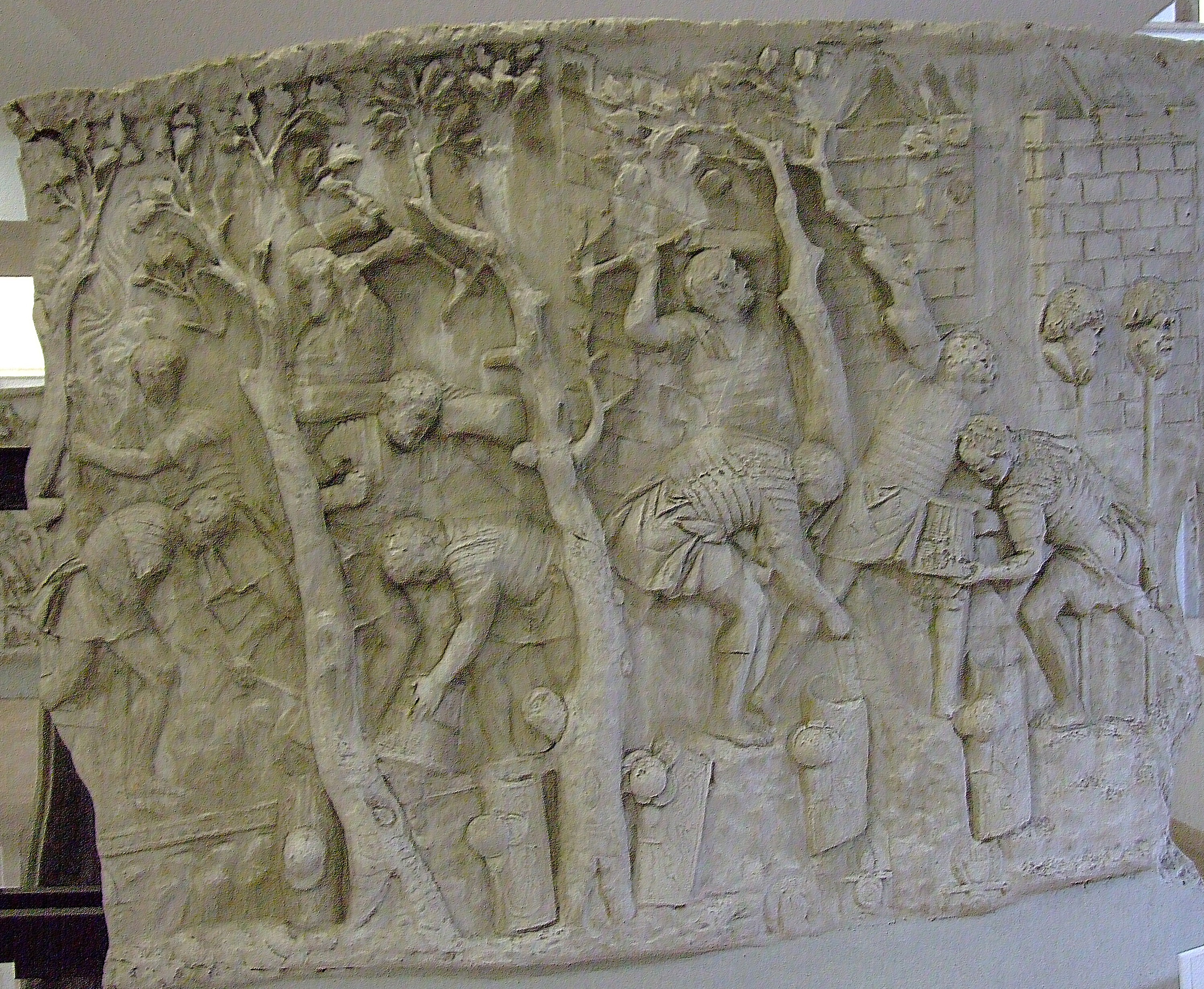
Roman legionaries building a road in Dacia during the Dacian wars (AD 101–6). Detail of bas-relief from Trajan's Column, Rome

The most important non-military activity of the Roman army was construction. The army was a large workforce of fit, disciplined men which also comprised hundreds of skilled craftsmen. Troops were on regular salaries anyway, so it was cheaper for the government to use them for building projects, if the security situation in the province allowed, than to hire private contractors. In fact, soldiers spent far more of their working lives on building-sites than on campaign and it would not be a huge exaggeration to describe an imperial legion as an armed construction-gang.

Soldiers built their own forts and fortifications and other military facilities, e.g., Hadrian's Wall itself was built by the army. But they also built up much of a province's Roman infrastructure: trunk Roman roads, bridges, docks, canals, aqueducts, entire new cities such as coloniae for veteran legionaries, public buildings (e.g., basilicas and amphitheatres). The army also carried out large-scale projects to increase the land available for agriculture, such as forest clearance and draining marshes (e.g., the large-scale drainage of the Fens in eastern England, which were probably developed as a huge imperial estate). The army also excavated many of the mines and quarries that produced the raw materials it needed for weapons and armour manufacture and for construction. Soldiers would supervise the slave-gangs that generally worked the mines, or mine themselves at times of urgent demand.

Most of the available evidence relates to legionary construction. The several construction-scenes on Trajan's Column show only legionaries working, with auxiliaries standing guard around them. On Hadrian's Wall, legionary stamps only have been found on building-materials, with no evidence of auxiliary involvement. Birley suggests that auxiliaries may have been used to excavate the vallum, a large ditch which runs parallel to the Wall, and thus would not have left stamps on building-materials. But it is also possible that auxiliary regiments were tasked with maintaining security on the border during construction. However, the Vindolanda tablets attest to construction activity by auxiliaries, e.g., one tablet refers to 12 soldiers detailed to work on the construction of a bath-house (balneum) at Vindolanda. Another possibly refers to the construction of a bridge elsewhere.

=== Social life ===
All the Vindolanda documents are written by officers, supporting the view that many of the lower ranks may have been illiterate. The language used is always Latin, usually of a reasonable standard. Most of the authors were Gauls, Britons or Germans, whose native languages were Celtic or Germanic, yet they wrote even to their relatives in Latin. This does not mean that they could no longer speak their native tongues, simply that those tongues never developed a written form. The tablets show that the commanding officer was addressed as domine ("master" or "lord", due to his equestrian rank) and soldiers of the same rank as frater ("brother") or collega ("comrade"). The letters show that an auxiliary soldier maintained friendships not just in his own regiment, but also in other regiments and even in the legions. Hunting was a favourite leisure activity, for the officers at least. It was more strenuous, dangerous and required far greater skill than today due to the lack of firearms: prey had to be brought down with arrows or spears.

=== Religion ===
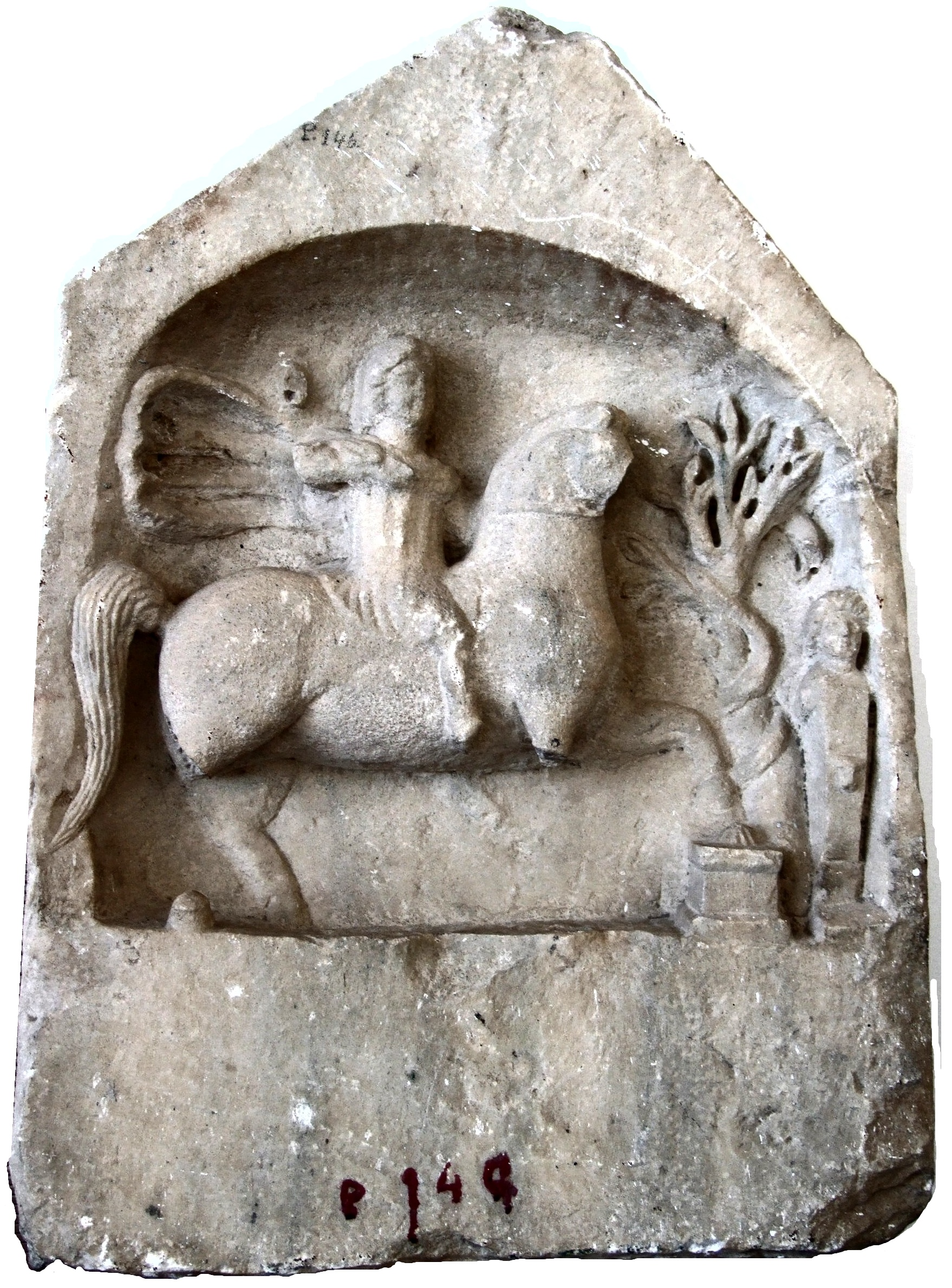
Bas-relief of Thracian Heros. The relief is incomplete, missing the rider's lance and victim. Histria Museum, Romania

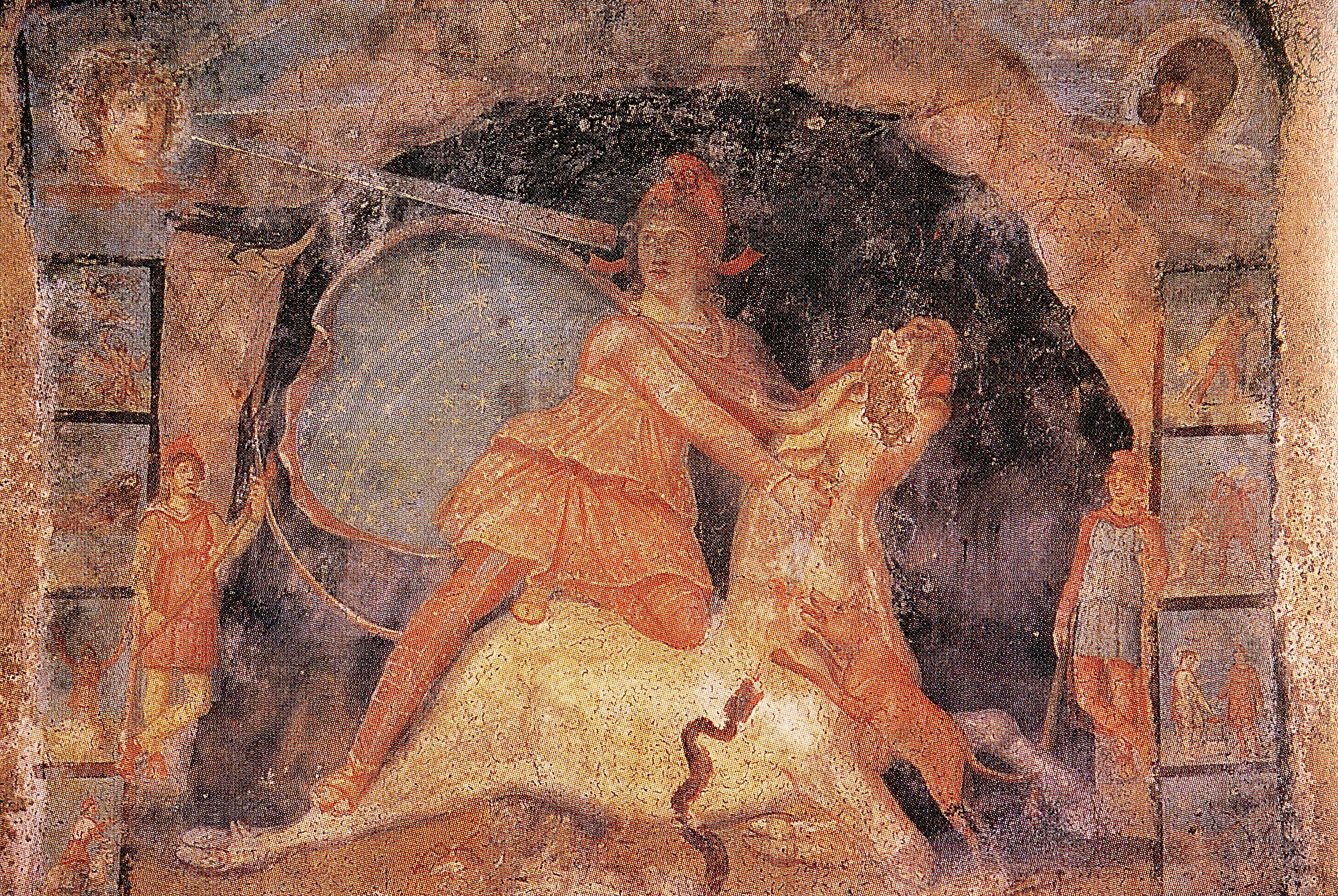
Wall painting showing Mithras slaying a bull, the central ritual act of the Mithraic cult (the tauroctony). Note Mithras' Phrygian cap, his cloak containing the celestial firmament, the serpent and the cave, in which the cult act is taking place. Mithraic temples sought to reproduce a cave-like environment. The symbolism, rites and tenets of the cult are obscure. From Dura Europos, on the Euphrates, Syria

Roman religion was polytheistic and therefore readily accepted and absorbed many deities of the empire's subjects, the vast majority of whose cultures were also polytheistic. But there were limits: the Romans forbade cults whose beliefs or practices were considered incompatible with the basic tenets of Roman religion. For example, the Romans proscribed cults that practised human sacrifice, which was partly the reason why Druidism was banned under the emperor Tiberius (political considerations were also involved, namely that Druids were suspected of orchestrating native resistance to Roman rule in Gaul). (Note: Roman human sacrifice: The Romans themselves only definitively banned human sacrifice, by senatorial decree, in 97 BC. But it was by then very rare, only practiced in times of extreme national emergency. e.g. after their disastrous defeat at the Battle of Cannae (216 BC), the Romans had, after consulting the Sibylline Books, buried alive in the Forum Boarium (Cattle Market), a pair of Gauls and a pair of Greeks.) Also banned was Christianity, de facto initially, as membership of the Christian church was not prohibited formally until the rule of Septimius Severus (197-211). A monotheistic religion, its followers refused to participate in the imperial cult, the worship of the imagines (cult portraits or statues) of ruling and past emperors. The cult was used by the Romans in the same way as an oath of allegiance is used by modern societies, as an affirmation of loyalty to the state. It was compulsory for all peregrini to make burnt sacrifice to the image of the ruling emperor at least once (certificates were issued to prove compliance). Refusal was considered treasonous and was punishable by death. Christians were also widely suspected, through a misunderstanding of baptism and the eucharist, of practicing clandestine ritual murder of infants (by drowning) and cannibalism respectively, violating two more Roman taboos.

In theory, soldiers were only permitted to honour such non-Roman gods as had been officially approved by the collegium pontificum ("Board of High Priests") in Rome, which regulated the state religion. The board would assess whether a foreign cult was acceptable. If so, by the process of interpretatio romana, a non-Roman god was officially annexed to a Roman god on the basis of shared characteristics e.g., Mars Toutates, the assimilation of a Gallic deity to the Roman god of war. In practice, off-duty soldiers were allowed to follow whatever cults they pleased, providing they were not specifically prohibited. Many surviving military dedications, especially those offered by the lower ranks, are to non-Roman deities alone.

Soldiers were, however, required to participate in a number of official Roman religious rites held by their regiment at regular times in the year. These included religious parades in honour of the most important Roman gods, especially Jupiter, the supreme god of the Roman pantheon: many altars and tombstones dedicated by the military are headed with the letters IOM (Iovi Optimo Maximo: "to Jupiter the Best and Greatest"); Mars, the god of war; and Minerva, a goddess also associated with war. These parades were probably accompanied by animal sacrifices and feasting. Another important regimental cult was emperor-worship. Parades were held on imperial birthdays, when the imagines of the ruling emperor and of deified previous emperors would be saluted and offered sacrifices by the prefect of the regiment.

Outside of the regimental ceremonies, soldiers revered a vast array of deities. These can be divided into three categories: Roman gods; their own native gods, such as the Thracian Heros, which is often represented on the tombstones of Thracian veterans as a mounted warrior spearing a beast (or man) on the ground; and the local gods of the province in which they served, such as the cult of Coventina in Britain. Coventina was a British nymph associated with springs. Several dedications to her have been found, e.g., those offered by the garrison of the auxiliary fort at Carrawburgh (on Hadrian's Wall).

From the 2nd century onwards, Eastern mystery cults, centred on a single deity (though not necessarily monotheistic) and based on sacred truths revealed only to the initiated, spread widely in the empire, as polytheism underwent a gradual, and ultimately terminal, decline. One such cult, that of Sol Invictus ("The Invincible Sun"), was designated as the official army-cult by the emperor Aurelian (r. 270–5) and remained such until the time of Constantine I (r. 312–37). However, by far the most popular among the Roman military was Mithraism, centred on a deity called Mithras. The mainstream view is that this originated in the Persian cult of Mithra, but the salient features of the Roman cult are absent in the Avesta and other Iranian evidence. It is thus possible that the Roman cult was not connected to the Iranian (except perhaps that the deity's name was borrowed) and instead originated in the eastern provinces of the empire itself, most likely in Phrygia. Mithraism was probably a medley of elements from various cults – hence its apparent adoption of a Persian deity-name, of the taurobolium ritual from the cult of Cybele, and of the Phrygian cap. Based on secret initiation ceremonies and rites, this cult is attested, for example, by the discovery of a Mithraeum (Mithraic temple) at Carrawburgh fort near Hadrian's Wall. Membership, according to the written evidence of dedications in Nida (Heddernheim), was not restricted according to social standing.

Christianity, as a prohibited cult, was much less common amongst the military until it was legalised, and indeed favoured, by Constantine I in the early 4th century. Nevertheless, it probably had some clandestine followers in the military during the 2nd and 3rd centuries, especially in the East, where it had spread widely. The discovery of a Christian house church with the earliest Christian paintings extant (early 3rd century) at the fortress town of Dura-Europos in Syria may indicate a Christian element in that town's garrison.

== Sources ==
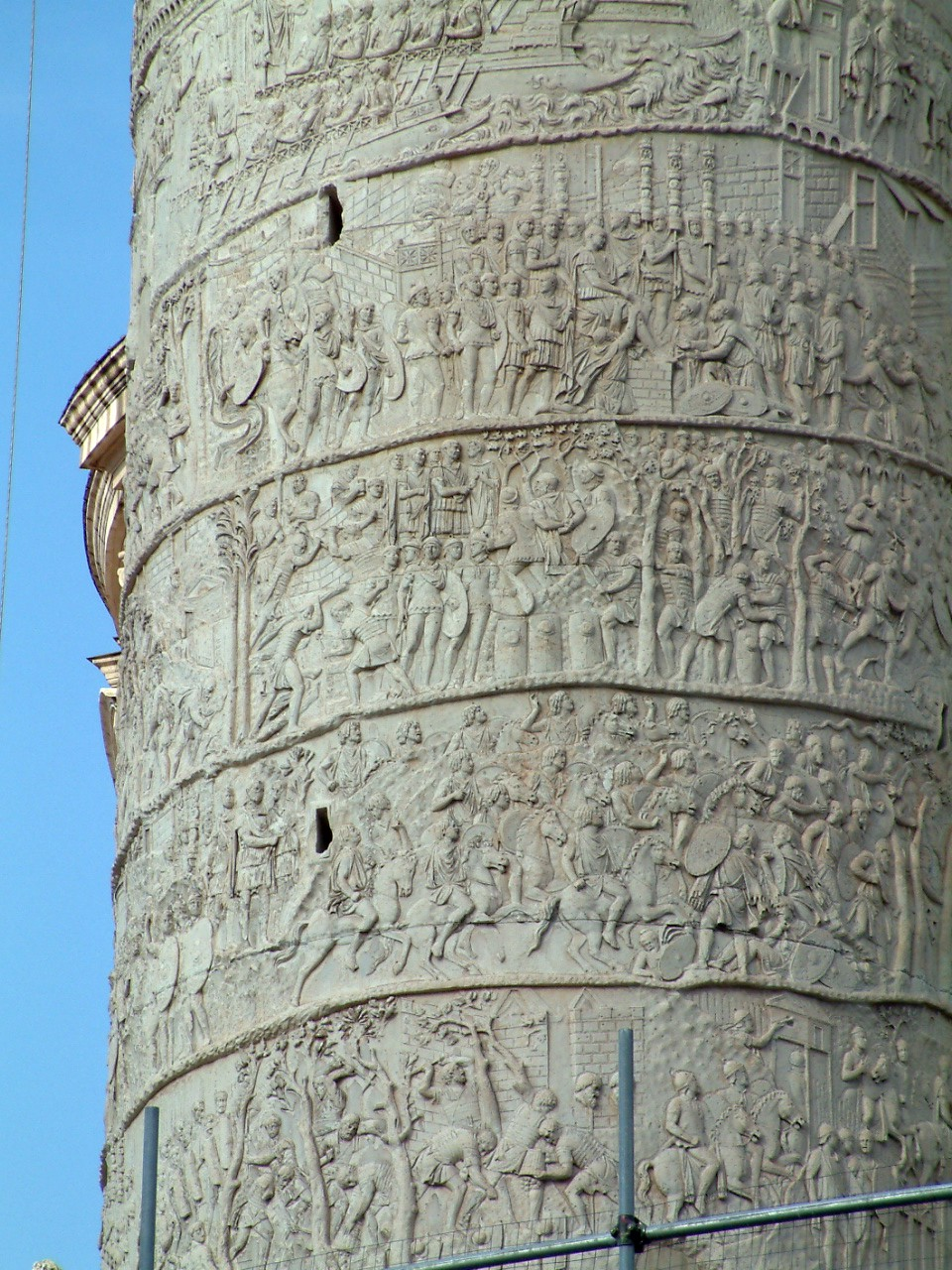
Section of Trajan's Column, Rome, showing the spiral friezes that represent the best surviving evidence of the equipment of imperial Roman soldiers

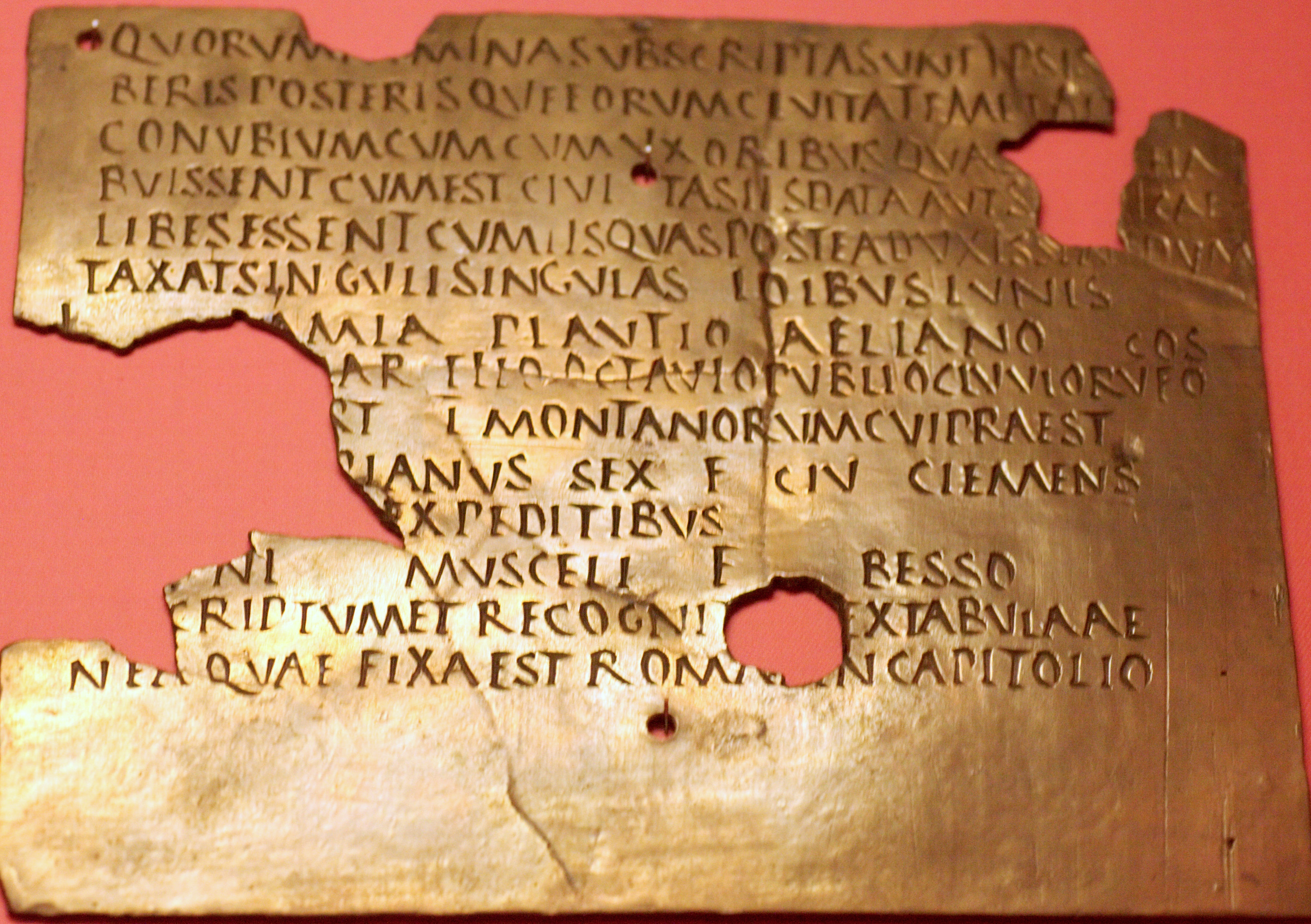
Surviving fragment of a Roman military diploma found at Carnuntum (now in Austria) in the province of Pannonia

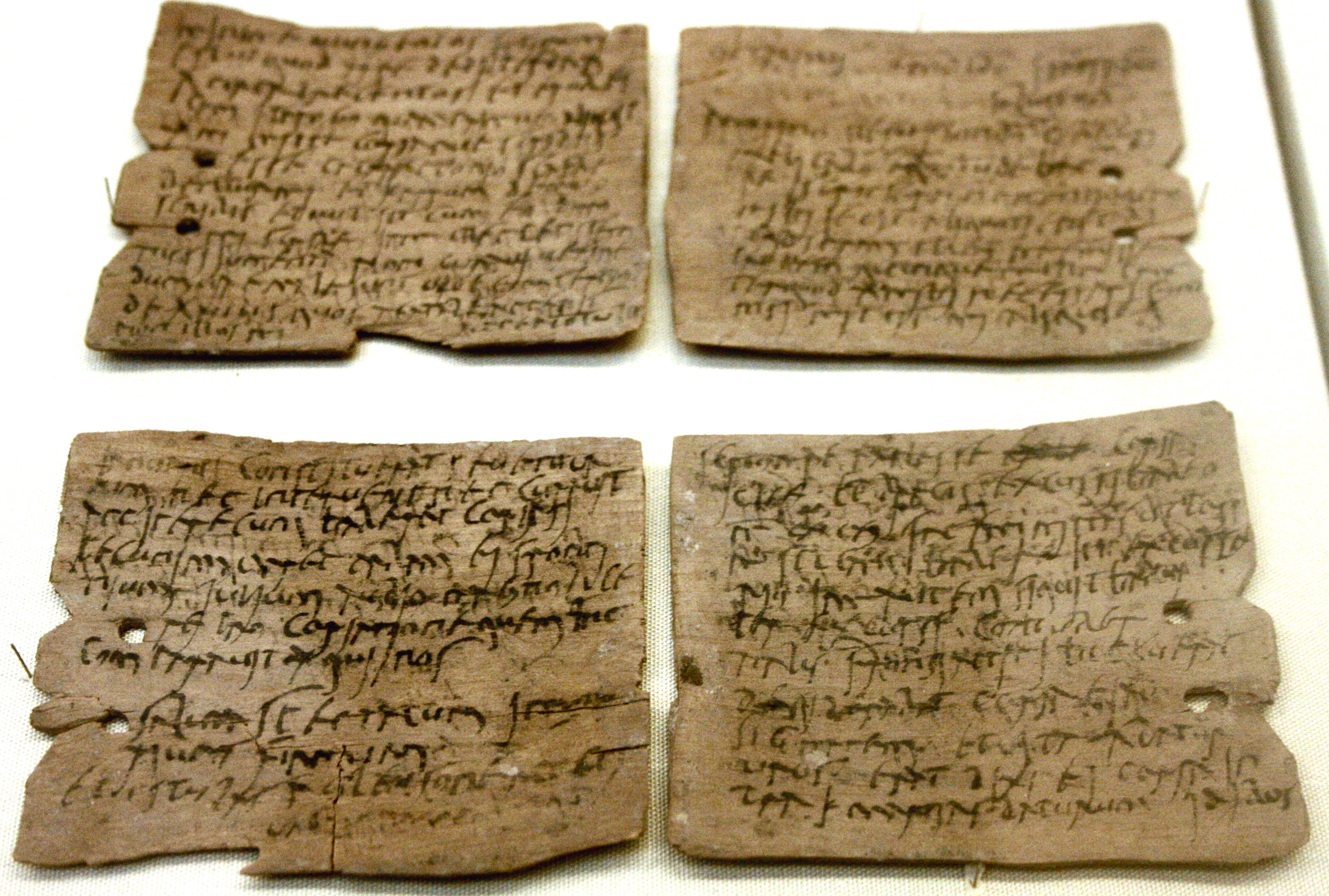
Specimen Vindolanda tablets

Except for the early 1st century, the literary evidence for the Principate period is surprisingly thin, due to the loss of a large number of contemporary historical works. From the point of view of the imperial army, the most useful sources are: firstly, works by the general Caius Julius Caesar, Commentarii de Bello Gallico and Commentarii de Bello Civili, covering his conquest of Gaul (58-50 BC) and his civil war against rival general Pompey (49-48 BC), respectively. Strictly speaking, these wars pre-date the army's imperial period (which started in 30 BC), but Caesar's detailed accounts are close enough in time to provide a wealth of information about organisation and tactics still relevant to the imperial legions. Secondly, works by the imperial-era historian Tacitus, writing around AD 100. These are the Annales, a chronicle of the Julio-Claudian era from the death of the founder-emperor Augustus to that of Nero (AD 14–68). Even this suffers from large gaps, amounting to about a third of the original; the Historiae was the sequel to the Annales, bringing the chronicle up to the death of Domitian (AD 96), of which only the first part, a detailed account of the Civil War of 68-9 survives; and the Agricola, a biography of Tacitus' own father-in-law, Gnaeus Julius Agricola, who as governor of Britain (AD 78–85) attempted to subjugate Caledonia (Scotland) to Roman rule. The third important literary source is De Re Militari, a treatise on Roman military practices by Vegetius, written c. 400. This contains much useful material relating to the Principate period, but the author's statements are undated and sometimes unreliable. Also useful are: The Jewish War by Josephus, an eyewitness account of the First Jewish revolt of AD 66–70 by one of the Jewish commanders who defected to the Romans after he was captured; the essay Acies contra Alanos (Ektaxis kata Alanon) by the Greek author Arrian, who was imperial governor of Cappadocia in AD 135-8: this describes a campaign led by the author to repel an invasion of his province by the Alans, an Iranian people of the Caucasus region. But most Roman historians present only a very limited picture of the imperial army's affairs, as they describe only military campaigns and say little about the army's organisation, logistics and the daily lives of the troops. Fortunately, the thin and fragmentary literary evidence has been complemented by a vast mass of inscription and archaeological evidence.

The imperial army was a highly bureaucratised institution. Meticulous financial records were kept by units' cornicularii (book-keepers). Detailed records were kept on all individual soldiers and there is evidence of filing systems. Even minor matters such as soldiers' requests to their praefectus for leave commeatus had to be submitted in writing. From the evidence discovered at Vindolanda, a fort near Hadrian's Wall, it can be deduced that the Roman garrison in the province of Britain alone generated tens of millions of documents. However, only an infinitesimal fraction of this vast documentation has survived, due to organic decomposition of the writing-medium (wooden and wax-tablets and papyrus). The only region of the empire where the army's documentation has survived in significant quantities is Egypt, where exceptionally dry conditions have prevented decomposition. Egyptian papyri are thus a crucial source for the army's internal organisation and life. The Vindolanda tablets, documents inscribed on wooden tablets and preserved by unusual anoxic conditions, are a rare corpus of army documents from the north-western part of the Empire. They consist of a series of letters and memoranda between officers of three auxiliary regiments stationed in succession at Vindolanda AD 85–122. They provide a valuable glimpse of the real lives and activities of the garrison of an auxiliary fort.

A large corpus of inscription evidence has been preserved on inorganic materials such as metal or stone.

Of outstanding importance are the bas-reliefs on monuments erected by emperors to record their victorious wars. The most notable example is Trajan's Column in Rome. Erected in 112 to celebrate the Emperor Trajan's successful conquest of Dacia (101–7), the reliefs provide the most comprehensive and detailed portrayal of Roman military equipment and practice extant. Other examples include imperial triumphal arches (see List of Roman triumphal arches). Another major source on stone is the extensive corpus of recovered tombstones of Roman soldiers. These often carry reliefs showing the subject in full combat dress plus inscriptions containing a summary of his career (age, units served, ranks held). Also important are dedications of votive altars by military personnel, which shed light on the dedicator's religious beliefs. In the case of both tombstones and altars, officers are disproportionately represented, due to the substantial expense of such monuments.

Notable metal documents are Roman military diplomas. A diploma was a bronze tablet issued, between c. AD 50 and 212 (when all free inhabitants of the empire were granted Roman citizenship) to an auxiliary soldier on completion of his 25-year term of service to prove the award of citizenship to the holder and his family. A particular advantage of diplomas for historians is that they are accurately datable. Diplomas also normally list the names of several auxiliary units which served in the same province at the same time, critical data on the deployment of auxiliary units in the various provinces of the Empire at different times. Also usually recorded are: beneficiary's regiment, regimental commander's name, beneficiary's military rank, name of beneficiary, name of beneficiary's father and origin (nation, tribe or city); name of beneficiary's wife and name of her father and origin; and names of children granted citizenship. Over 800 diplomas have been recovered, although most in a fragmentary state. (Even these, however, represent an infinitesimal fraction of the hundreds of thousands of diplomas which must have been issued. Apart from natural corrosion, the main reason for this low recovery rate is that, prior due to the late 19th century, when their historical value was recognised, diplomas were almost invariably melted down when found in order to recover their copper content – indeed most were probably melted down in the period following 212).

Finally, a mass of information has been uncovered by archaeological excavation of imperial military sites: legionary fortresses, auxiliary forts, marching-camps and other facilities such as signal-stations. A prime example is Vindolanda fort itself, where excavations began in the 1930s and continue in 2012 (under the grandson of the first director, Eric Birley). Such excavations have uncovered details of the lay-out and facilities of military sites and remains of military equipment.

== See also ==
- Roman army
- Auxilia
- Campaign history of the Roman military
- Equestrian order
- Structural history of the Roman military
- Auxiliaries in Britain (Roman military)
- List of Roman auxiliary regiments
- List of Roman legions
- Veteran (Roman history)
