= List of Roman armour components =

This list identifies various pieces of body armour worn both by men and horses during the roman empire from its beginning in the 8th century BC to its end in the 6th century AD, arranged by the part of body that is protected and roughly by date.

== List ==
Summary comparison of components of roman harness
Name	Example	Period (Century)	Description
Head
Coolus		3rd century BC to 1st century CE	Originally the coolus had no cheek-pieces nor a reinforcing peak. It was fixed to the head with a chin strap instead. In contrast to the Montefortino the first variants did not feature a crestknob. Only at the first half of the 1st century AD the helmet received a crestknob and a reinforcing peak. It was not until the end of the 1st century CE that the first, metal cheek-pieces began to appear. These were still relatively flat, simply shaped, and had hardly any embossed ridges or curves. All coolus variants were made from bronze.
Montefortino		late 3rd century BC first half of the 1st century AD	The helmet was direct precursor to Celtic helmets. It arrived in Italy following the Gallic invasions in the late 5th or early 4th century B.C. The cheek pieces were made of thick metal with a protruding outer edge. They were attached to the helmet by means of a hinge on the upper edge, secured with three to four small rivets. Hooks riveted to the inside, with button-shaped ends that curved outward, were used to fasten the chin strap. During the reign of Augustus, these were partially replaced by conical rivets near the lower edge. All Montefortino variants were made from bronze.
Imperial helmet		Approx. 20 BC to mid-3rd century AD	The Imperial helmet is divided into two subgroups: the Imperial-Gallic helmet and the Imperial-Italic helmet. All helmets in both subgroups shared a distinctive, backward-sloping neck guard to protect against bladed and piercing weapons, as well as cutouts on the sides for the ears, often edged with small protective plates. The Imperial-Gallic helmet evolved directly from the Gallic iron helmets known as the Agen and Port. The main feature of the Imperial-Gallic helmet was its stylized eyebrows above the reinforced peak. Imperial-italic helmets originate from the Etruscan Republican period. Furthermore, Imperial helmets were made of iron or bronze.
Cavalry helmet		late 2nd century AD to mid 3rd century AD	The helmet featured bronze fittings, large enveloping cheek-pieces and an comb, attached with large conical-headed rivets, running down from just forward of the centre of the crown to a short distance above the neck-flange. The edges of the cheek pieces are reinforced with a strip of bronze, below the hinge.
Attic helmet			The Attic helmet taken over from the Greek was worn by Emperors, the Praetorian Guard and Officers. The helmet was richly decorated with a wide variety of motifs, such as laurel and acanthus leaves, animals, and mythical creatures. The helmet featured a browband shaped like a vertical fronton, which was also adorned with different motifs, including geometric patterns such as lines, dots, and busts enclosed in diamonds or circles. The cheek pieces were often polished and embellished with ornaments such as thunderbolts or the Sidus Iulium.
Spangenhelm		late 3rd century AD	The helmet featured a metal browband consisting of several metal strips (Spangen) that converged at a conical curve at the tip of the helmet or a helmet spike. Sometimes there ware nose and neck guards attached to it. The cheek-pieces also varied in size and were joint to the bowl by hinges.
Ridge helmet		early 4th century AD	The ridge helmet, presumably of Persian origin, consisted of two halves that were divided into further riveted segments and connected by a rounded ridge running from front to back. There were two variants: a simple one with narrow cheek pieces and an ear cutout, and a more elaborate one with decorations, large cheek pieces, and a nose guard.
Persona			The face mask made of polished iron, intended for parades or cavalry exercises, as well as a means of intimidating the enemy during battle.
Torso
lorica hamata			Chain mail consisting either of bronze or iron. Adopted by the Gauls as roman autors referred to it as Gallic mail. Some of these were made with short sleeves and others with no sleeves at all. From the army reforms of Marius (157-86 B.C.), onwards lorica hamata became standard body armor for both cavalry and infantry. The lorica hamata could be reinforced with wide shoulder straps that were fastened to the breastplate using bronze rivets or metal studs. Underneath a leather or cloth garment was worn.
lorica plumata		1st century AD to mid 3rd century AD	A variant of the lorica squamata with scales resembling feathers. The scales were attached to a ring mail and thus represented a hybrid form of Lorica hamata and Lorica squamata. Due to the extensive manufacturing involved, it was presumably worn only by officers.
lorica segmentata		1st century AD to 2nd Century AD	The lorica segmentata was made primarily of iron or steel. Some suits of armor were additionally tin-plated or coated with a thin layer of brass or bronze to protect against corrosion. The fasteners, such as rivets, hinges, and hooks, were made of bronze or brass. The armor was divided into several segments to allow for flexibility and freedom of movement without compromising the wearer’s protection. The shoulder sections consisted of curved plates that rested on the shoulders and protected the upper chest and back. These plates were connected to one another by hinges and straps and could move with the arms. The chest, back, waist, and abdomen were protected by horizontal plates that wrapped around the body. Inside the armor, the plates were secured with leather straps to keep them in place and allow for freedom of movement. These straps were attached to the front of the plates to fasten the armor. The shoulder plates and some other areas were connected by hinges, which provided additional flexibility and stability. Underneath the lorica segmentata, soldiers typically wore a subarmalis, which increased comfort and cushioned the impact of blows. This tunic also prevented the metal plates from resting directly on the skin.
lorica squamata		3rd century BC to 5th century AD	The lorica squamata (scale armor), also of Greek origin, was made of bronze or iron. The scales were arranged in rows and joined together with small, twisted bronze wires or metal strips through pairs of holes in the center of their side edges. The scales overlapped one another, which prevented them from drifting apart and provided double protection. The connected rows of scales were usually sewn or laced onto a supporting fabric through holes at the top edge. Bronze scales were the most common type and were generally thinner than those made of iron. The bottom edge was usually rounded, but could also have sharp points or be straight. The scales themselves were either flat or slightly domed.
lorica musculata		4th century BC to 5th century AD	The muscle cuirass worn by Roman emperors the Praetorian Guard senior officers and marines was of Hellenistic origin. In Republican times they only showed a human male torso with no ornament. It was not until the 1st century CE that the cuirass featured ornament. The muscle cuirass of the Imperial era could be decorated with the head of Medusa, griffins, winged Victory figures, a central motif such as a trophy of war hanging from a tree trunk, or a figure of Minerva. These were often combined with acanthus leaves, curving tendrils, or small human figures. Plainer and less decorated cuirasses featured the cingulum worn over them. Breast and back-plates were joined by means of two hinges or pairs of rings joined by ties at the left and right sides. The lower edge of the cuirass were also applied with metal decoration, and these too may be hinged. The scalloped tabs around the lower edge of the breastplate were also adorned with metal ornament and fitted with hinges.
Arm
Manica		1st century AD	The arm guards, most likely adopted from gladiators, consisted of laminated iron plates. Manicae sometimes also included gauntlets.
Leg
Ocrea			Ocreae (greaves) were initially worn by all the infantry. During the late Republican period, only centurions stil wore silver-plated and tin-plated ocreae.
Various
Cingulum militare		6th century BC	The Cingulum Militare was a metal-covered leather belt of Etruscan origin. By the 1st century AD, a loincloth made of 4–8 leather strips with round metal fittings had come into use; it was fastened at the front to one of the belts and hung down over the lower abdomen. In addition to its decorative function, it presumably served to protect the genitalia.
Subarmalis			Subarmalis or thoracomachus roman padded garment similar to the brigandine.
Horse
frontale		4th century BC	Early Frontale were made of bronze based on the Greek pattern and covered only the forehead, but not the horse’s cheeks or eyes. By the 1st century CE, two new variants appeared. One consisted of thick beef leather lined with goatskin and decorated with bronze or brass nails. The other consisted of three richly decorated metal pieces connected by hinges and equipped with eye guards in the form of protective baskets.
Catafracta		3rd century BC	Cataphracta were introduced into the cavalry in the 3rd century BC. They consisted of coarse linen onto which bronze or iron scales were sewn, covering the head, neck, and torso. An oval opening was left for the saddle. Simpler versions were made of leather, rawhide, felt, or linen and had no or only partial metal reinforcement. Such a cataphracta could consist of up to 4,500 scales and weigh 40 kg.
Pectorale			Roman variant of the medieval peytral. Although bronze pectorals were known to have been used for ceremonial outfits, pectorals were made entirely of leather.

== Bibliography ==
- Connolly, Peter (1998). Greece and Rome at War. London: Greenhill Books. ISBN 1-85367-303-X.
- Elliott, Paul (2012). The Last Legionary: Life as a Roman Soldier in Britain, AD 400. Stroud: Spellmount. ISBN 978-0-7524-5927-1.
- Goldsworthy, Adrian (2007). The Complete Roman Army. London: Thames & Hudson. ISBN 978-0-500-05124-5.
- Junkelmann, Marcus (1986). Die Legionen des Augustus. Mainz: Philipp von Zabern. ISBN 3-8053-0886-8.
- Junkelmann, Marcus (2008). Die Reiter Roms. Mainz: Philipp von Zabern. ISBN 978-3-8053-1288-2.
- Robinson, Russell (1975). The Armour of Imperial Rome. London: Arms and Armour Press.
- Sumner, Graham (2009). Roman Military Dress. Stroud: The History Press. ISBN 978-07524-4576-2.
- Sumner, Graham; D'Amato, Raffaele (2009). Arms and Armour of The Imperial Roman Soldier - From Marius To Commodus, 112 BC - AD 192. Barnsley: Pen & Sword. ISBN 1-84832-512-6.
- Tarassuk, Leonid; Blair, Claude, eds. (1982). The complete Encyclopedia of Arms & Weapons. New York: Simon and Schuster.
- Webster, Graham (1985). The Roman Imperial Army of the first and second centuries A.D. Totowa: Barnes & Noble. ISBN 0-38920-590-7.
