= Loculus =

Loculus may refer to:

- Loculus (satchel)
- Loculus (architecture), a burial niche
- An alternative name for a locule, or compartment in an organism.
- Loculus of Archimedes or Ostomachion, a mathematical puzzle similar to tangrams
