= Manica (armguard) =

Component of late antique armor

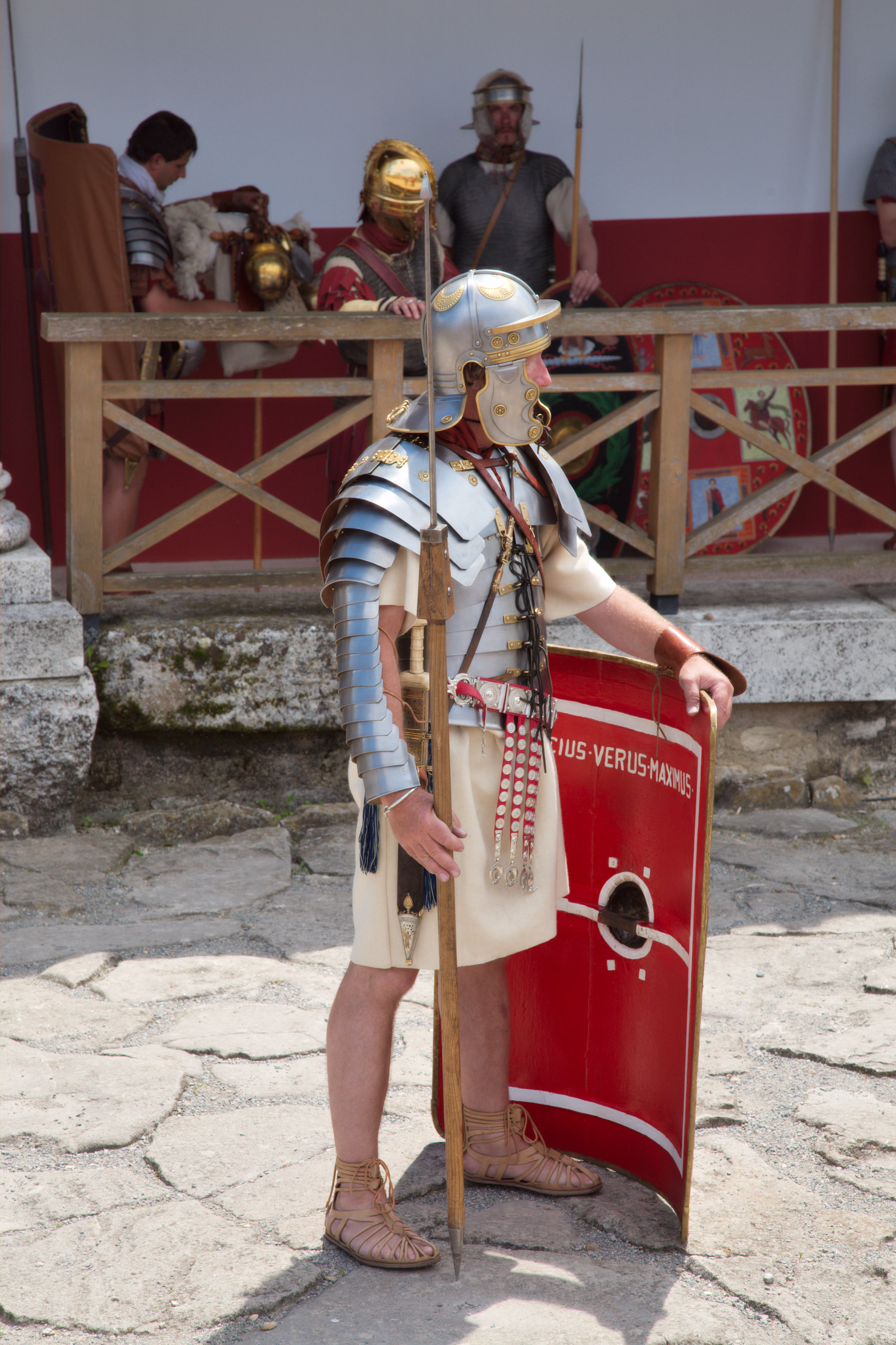
Reenactment of a second century Roman legionary wearing a manica over his right arm

A manica (Latin: [ˈmanɪka]; Latin for 'sleeve'; Ancient Greek: χεῖρες, romanized: kheîres, lit. 'sleeves') was a type of iron or copper-alloy laminated arm guard with curved, overlapping metal segments or plates fastened to leather straps worn by ancient and late antique heavy cavalry, infantry, and gladiators. It is most widely associated with use by the Romans, Parthians, and Achaemenid and Sasanian Persians.

== Terminology ==
The term manica is only used once to refer to arm armor, where Juvenal mentions the armor of a Gladiator as "...balteus et manicae et cristae crurisque sinistri dimidium tegimen!" ("...strap and arm-guards and crests and half-covering of the left leg.") In Greek, Xenophon gives the terms χειρῖδας (kheiridas) and χεῖρα (kheira) in the Cyropaedia and his "On Cavalry," both of which describe the armor as covering from the shoulder to the hand as a complete sleeve.

== History ==
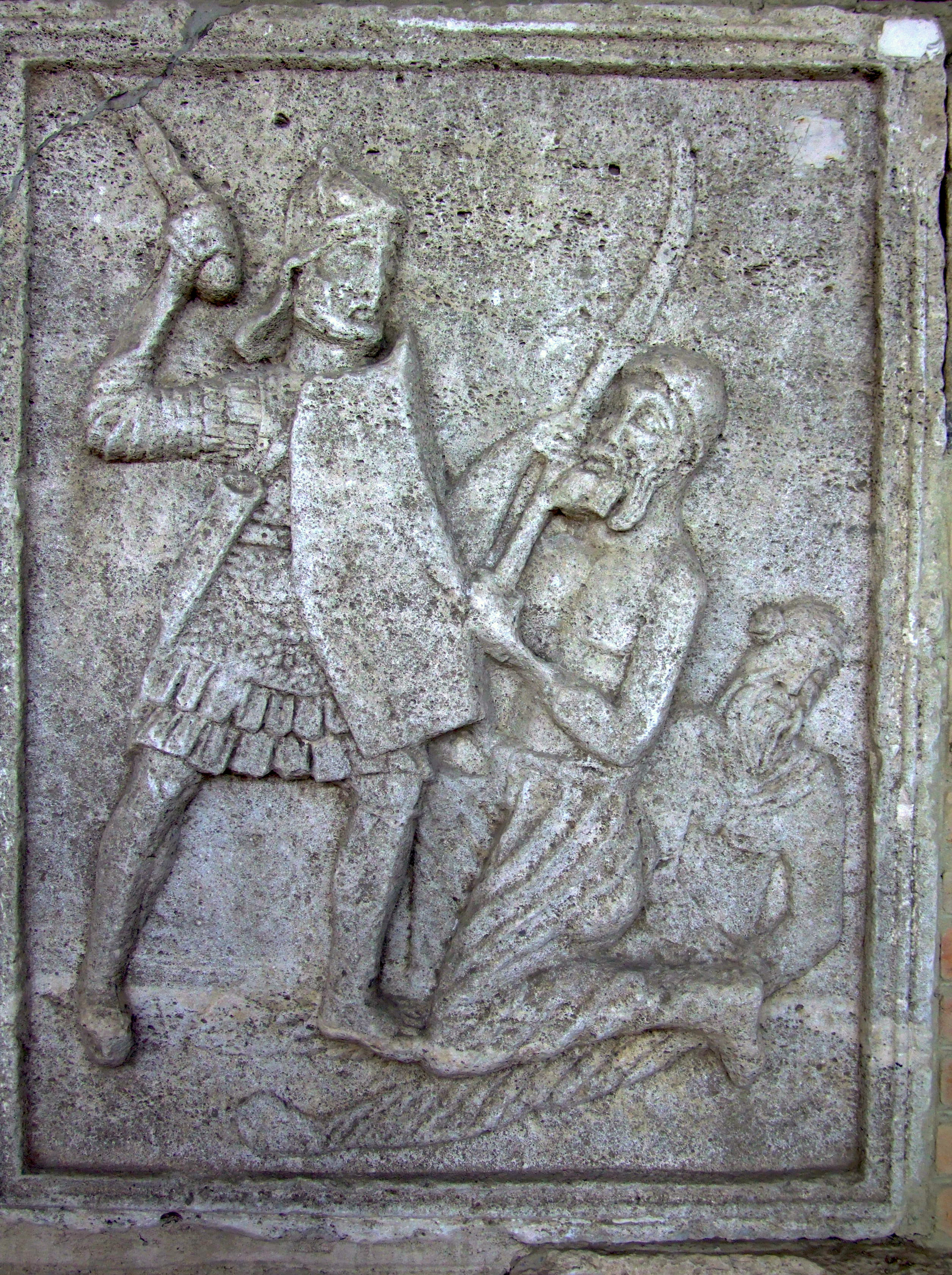
Tropaeum Traiani Metope XX Legionary with manica laminata and sword, facing a Dacian falxman

According to Xenophon, "kheires" (χεῖρες) which consisted of hoops of metal that would be worn on the rein arm of a cavalryman was a rather recent invention, suggesting it first emerged during the Achaemenid period around by end of the 5th century BCE. Hooped armor became extremely popular to use on both arms and legs in the Saka, Parthian, and Kushan kingdoms. They can be seen at Khalchayan and on many pieces of Parthian artwork, and were likely invented somewhere in Central Asia. The earliest finds of manica come from Central Asia, excavated at the sites of Ai Khanoum, Chirik Rabat, and Taxila. The first two examples date to the 2nd century BCE, and the last from the 1st century BCE. The armor from Ai Khanoum included an integrated gorget to which the manica was attached, while the armor from Taxila may have been for the thigh.

Manica was known in Anatolia by at least the 2nd century BCE, as evidenced on a relief from the Temple of Athena at Pergamon. Fragments of segmented iron armor have been found at Pergamon and dated to the early 1st century BCE, albeit it is uncertain if they formed part of a limb armor or a cuirass. Fragments of the upper cuisse (thigh-guard) of an iron manica for the leg have been found in the excavations at Gamla, dated to the second half of the 1st century BCE. Certainly by the siege of Gamla in 67 CE, it was already in Roman use where a complete spaulder (shoulder guard) for a manica was found in the panoply of L. Magus. This date coincides with the adoption of manica by Gladiators in the late 1st century CE proposed by Robinson, or the first half of the 1st century CE proposed by Bishop.

It is unclear how widely the manica was used in Trajan's Dacian Wars. Manicae (along with metal greaves) are attested as a supplement to metal body armor on several reliefs depicting that campaign, including the Tropaeum Traiani at Adamclisi and Trajan's Column. Trajan's column in Rome seems to suggest that the lorica segmentata and the manicae were only issued to Roman-born legionaries and not to auxiliaries. However, the Tropaeum Traiani, which is considered a better guide to the reality of field equipment, portrays Roman legionaries and heavy infantry auxiliaries equipped in the same fashion—both wearing scale body armour with manica arm guards.

Finds identified as manicae have come from Carlisle, Trimontium (Newstead), Carnuntum, Richborough, Coria (Corbridge), Eining (Abusina) on the Danube frontier, Leon, and Ulpia Traiana Sarmizegetusa. A very well preserved manica was found in 2010–11 in a soldier's barracks at the Roman castle of Steincheshof on the Rhine frontier. It dated from the last third of the first century to the first third of the second century. These suggest that manicae were used by the Roman military during the 1st century CE, independent from the Dacian wars, where the traditional interpretation was that the manica was introduced to protect soldiers from falxes.

The relief at Alba Julia provides evidence of the manica in use in the 2nd and 3rd centuries CE by the military. Ammianus also describes Roman cavalry (probably cataphractarii or clibanarii) on parade in 350 CE as having "...laminarum circuli tenues apti corporis flexibus ambiebant per omnia membra diducti." ("Thin circles of iron plates, fitted to the curves of their bodies, completely covered their limbs"). Around 400 CE, manicae are represented on the Column of Arcadius and in the Notitia Dignitatum. They are also attested archaeologically in this period, with finds of manica for the legs and arms excavated at Dura Europos in Syria and dated to shortly before the 257 destruction of the fortress, and a 5th century example was found at Bowes Moor in Britain. A hoard of 5th or 6th century armor from Debelt, Bulgaria, may possess arm and leg armor of laminated construction as well, albeit it remains unpublished. Schultheis believes this armor dates to the early 6th century based on apparent fragments of two Narona-type band helmets in the photographs. It is unclear if limb armor described by the 6th century author Procopius and in the early 7th century Strategikon refers to such segmented arm armor, as splinted vambraces and greaves are described in the latter text which had come into Roman use well before this time, alongside long-sleeved mail armor. It is certain that by the 9th century, both segmented and splinted leg armors had been replaced by mail chausses in early Bulgarian or Byzantine use.

In Sogdia, frescoes from Panjakent suggest manica for the arms and legs remained in use until at least the turn of the 8th century CE, and may have evolved into early bazubands (combined forearm and elbow armor). One 10th century depiction of Goliath from the Armenian Church of the Holy Cross at Aght'amar may also show a similar manica-like bazuband.

== Construction and Manufacture ==
M. C. Bishop lists likely components as one shoulder plate, about 35 metal (ferrous or copper alloy) strips, 90–120 leathering rivets, 3 or 4 internal leathers, and one padded lining. The lining may have been a separate component, in order to avoid it being torn by the articulated metal plates. The metal strips were about 25 to 30 mm wide and 0.35 to 0.5 mm in thickness; they were longer at the top of the arm and most examples had some form of rectangular or semicircular spaulder. Each strip had holes at its lower edge, through which flat-headed copper alloy rivets passed from the inside to hold the leather straps in place. It also had a hole punched at each end, which did not have a rivet and presumably served as an attachment point for an organic fastening. The lower few plates were in some cases riveted together, rather than articulated on leather. One depiction appears to show a manica terminating in a hand shape.

The usual arm position depicted for Roman swordsmen is with the upper arm vertical and close to the torso, the forearm extended horizontally with the thumb uppermost. The plates were probably not long enough to cover the whole circumference of the arm, but would have extended from the upper arm down to the thumb, leaving an unprotected area at the back. The plates overlapped upwards, directing any blow to the inside of the elbow which had a particularly dense coverage of multiple plates.

Due to the generalized meaning of the word manica, at least some references to this armor may also have included scale, splinted, or even mail armor. Scale demichausses are archaeologically evidenced as early as the 5th century BCE, while mail demichausses are archaeologically evidenced by the 1st century BCE, both from the Scythian and Sarmatian cultures. However, these early demichausses were integrated into the lower edge of the torso armor, rather than separate pieces worn themselves. The earliest evidence of independently affixed leg armor comes from the burial of a probably Sarmatian cataphractarius at Roshava Dragana in Bulgaria, dated to the 2nd century CE, and consisting of a hybrid of splinted and scale armor with poleyns (knee-cops) and scale demigreaves. Separate scale demichausses or arm-guards are evidenced from Dura Europos, also dating to shortly before the site's destruction in 257 CE. By the 3rd century CE, experimental mail sleeves and shin-height, fully enclosing chausses had developed for Gladiatorial combat. Whether or not these are related to the development of full mail chausses in the 9th century is uncertain.

== See also ==
- Laminar armour
- Lorica plumata
- Lorica squamata
