= Scale armour =

Protective gear using small, overlapping plates

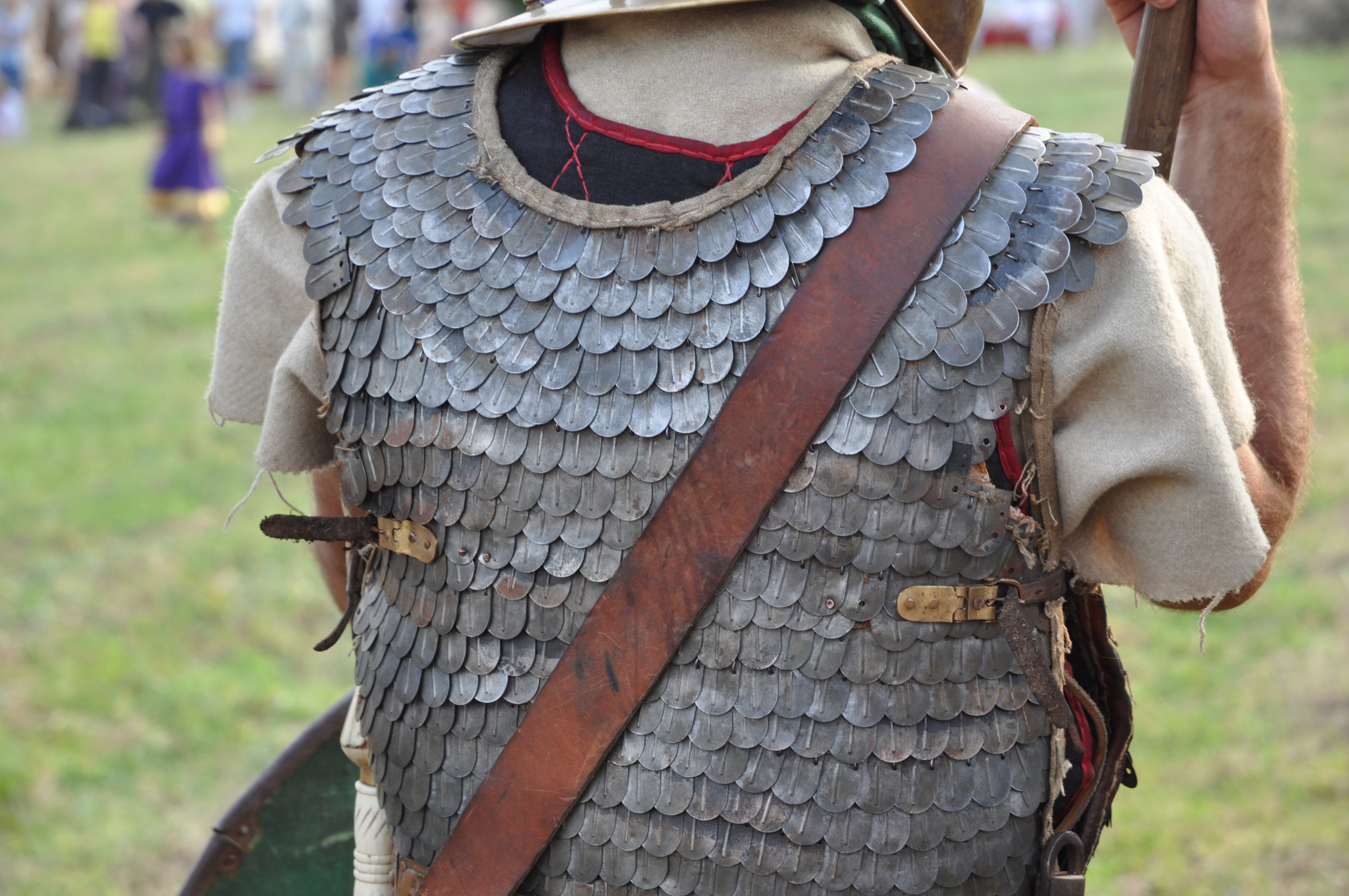
Modern reproduction of lorica squamata

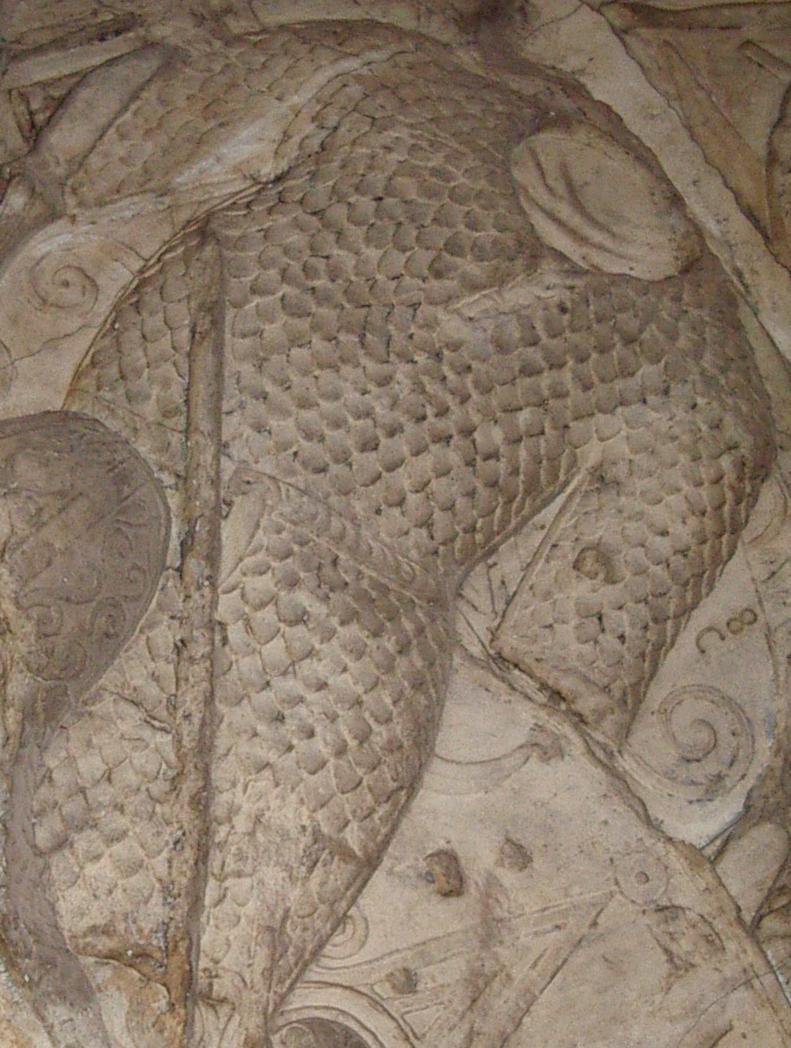
Dacian scale armour on Trajan's Column in Rome

Scale armour is an early form of armour consisting of many individual small armour scales (plates) of various shapes attached to each other and to a backing of cloth or leather in overlapping rows. Scale armour was worn by warriors of many different cultures as well as their horses. The material used to make the scales varied and included bronze, iron, steel, rawhide, leather, cuir bouilli, seeds, horn, or pangolin scales. The variations are primarily the result of material availability.

The earliest representation of scale armour was found in the tomb of Kenamon, who lived in Egypt during the reign of Amenhotep II (1436–1411 BC).

== Types ==
Scale armour is armour in which the individual scales are sewn or laced to a backing by one or more edges and arranged in overlapping rows resembling the scales of a fish/reptile or roofing tiles. The scales are usually assembled and strapped by lacing or rivets. Lorica squamata is an ancient Roman armour of this type.

Other types of armour made from individual scales but constructed in a different manner have their own separate names, such as lamellar armour where the individual scales are perforated on several or all edges and lashed tightly to each other in straight ridged rows and do not need to be attached to a backing. The Romans also had a variant called lorica plumata in which the scales were attached to mail.

== Historical information ==
=== Scythians ===
The Scythians' horse warriors appear to have used scale or possibly lamellar armour, evident both from contemporary illustrations and burial finds in kurgans. The armour was made from small plates of iron or bronze.

Due to the semi-rigid nature of the armour, the Scythian variety was made as breast- and back-plates, with separate shoulder pieces. Some finds indicate partial armour, where a leather shirt or similar garment has sewn-on scales in places, particularly around the neck and upper chest.

=== Roman scale armour ===
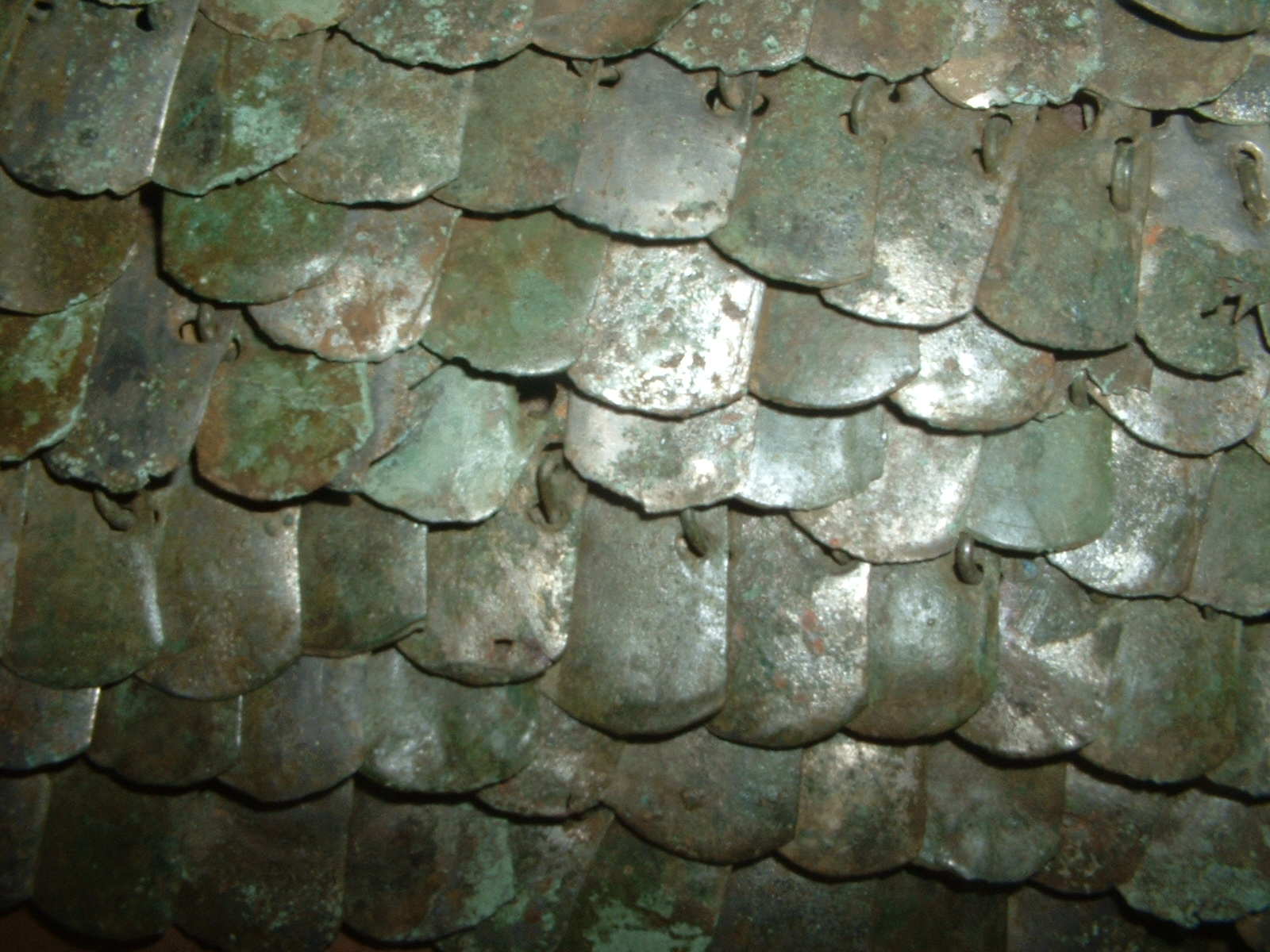
Fragment of lorica squamata. Each plate has six holes and the scales are linked in rows. Only the "lowermost" holes are visible on most scales, while a few show the pair above and the ring fastener passing through them.

The individual scales used to construct Roman armour are called squamae. During Roman times, scale armour (lorica squamata) was a popular alternative to mail (lorica hamata) as it offered better protection against blunt force trauma. Hellenistic-Attic lamellar armour was also widely used in Middle Eastern empires, such as Persia and Byzantium. In these areas, scales were commonly dished (that is, with a bowl effect from a depression being hammered into a flat piece of metal) in order to benefit from the extra protection offered by a rounded scale.

According to the statement of Herodotus, the ancient Persians wore tunics with sleeves of diverse colours, having upon them iron scales of the shape of fish-scales; this comparison indicates scale armour, and not mail, is meant.

Scale armour is not of frequent occurrence on the grave monuments of the German frontier. On two tombstones of the Sertorii at Verona (one that of a centurion, the other that of a standard-bearer) both figures are represented wearing a tunic of scale armour which covers the shoulders and comes down below the belt. The Carnuntum monument of Calidius (a work of the middle of the first century) shows also a scaled tunic of a centurion. Again, in the collection of marble portrait-busts from the great Gallo-Roman villa of Chiragan near Toulouse, the Emperors Antoninus Pius and Severus both appear wearing corselets of scale armour.

=== Medieval Europe ===
Metal scale armour was used throughout most of the European world for the duration of the medieval period. It was commonly used to augment other armour types, predominantly mail, but also plate armour taking the form of a cuirass over mail, scale pauldrons, or faulds (the lower part of a breastplate that protects the lower stomach, hips and groin). There is also evidence for scale sabatons (protective shoe coverings) and scale aventails. The use of these scale armoured components is commonly depicted in period art and funeral effigies. The funeral effigy of Sir Albrecht Von Hohenlohe circa 1325 AD depicts him wearing scaled body armour underneath his surcoat and over a mail haubergeon. Sir Albrecht's armour appears to be additionally riveted to the backing.

=== Korea ===
Scale armour was typically reserved for officers and senior soldiers in the militaries of various Korean states, including the period of the Three Kingdoms of Korea, due to cost and duration of production. As with other scale and lamellar styles of armour in other parts of the world, this armour was effective against light missiles and stabbing as well as against blade slashing, but not against heavy thrusts (e.g., from spears, ballista-type projectiles, and sword thrusts).

Early in the Joseon era (1392-1897), due to the cost and difficulty of bulk transport, an initiative was begun to replace metal (usually iron) components in armour with hardened leather in a majority of armour delivered/issued to military personnel. The tradeoff of this initiative (which was begun as early as 1457) was that while lighter, warmer, and more flexible than iron-scaled armour (as well as less costly to produce and easier to transport), the leather-based scaled armour provided less effective protection in combat.

By the time of the Japanese invasions of Korea from 1592-1598, some Korean military armour components had been switched over from iron to hardened leather, but extant examples and contemporary documentation indicate that those Korean personnel wearing armour still utilized iron scales and such armour proved to be effective against most Japanese weaponry (not so much against firearms) in combat.

Over the course of the Joseon Dynasty, Korean scaled armour changed in style. Initially the scales were on the exterior of the armour and thus attached to a base leather and fabric backing, but by the later Joseon era the scales (by this time mostly hardened leather) were riveted inside the armour coat, forming a type of brigandine armour.

=== China ===
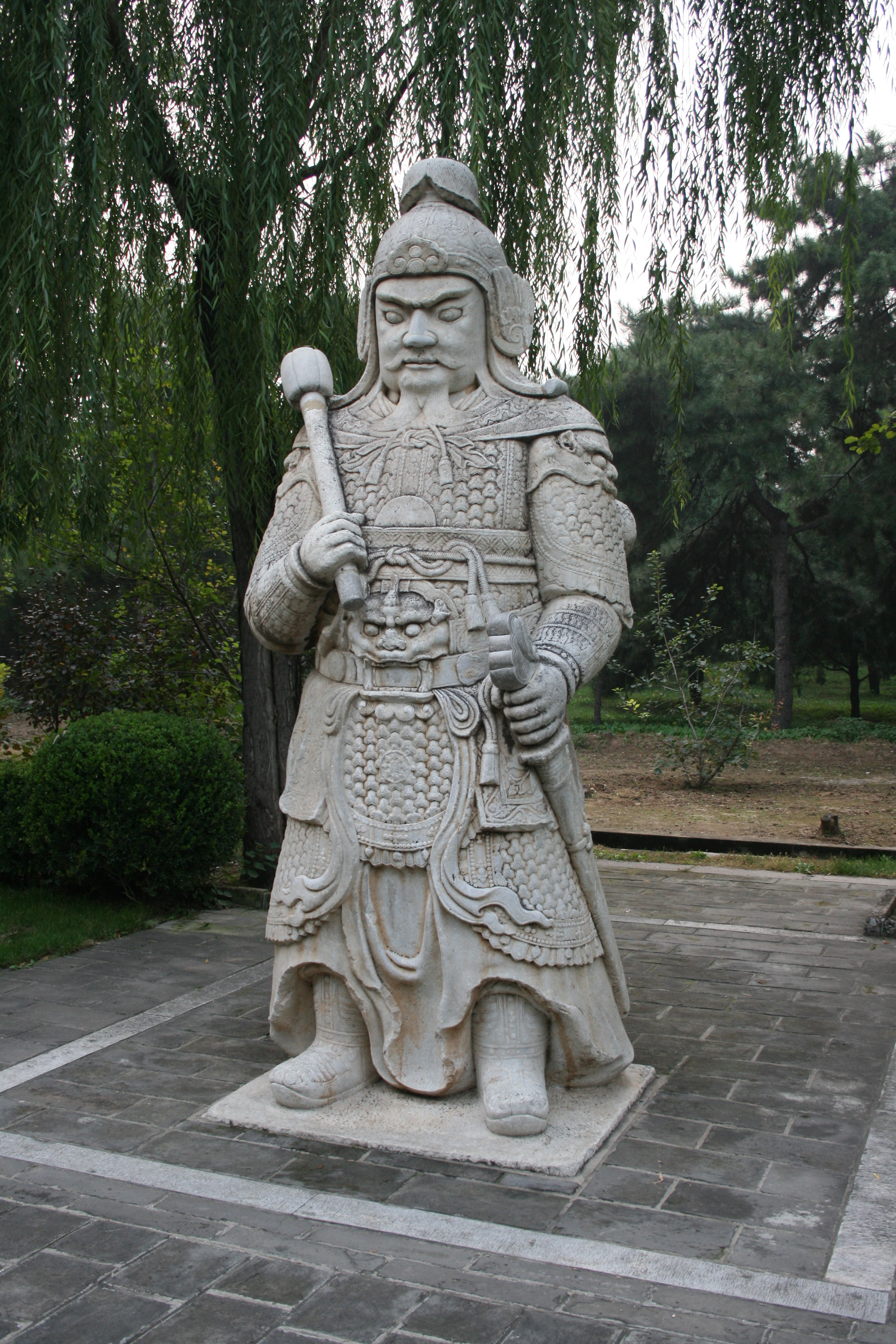
Ming dynasty tomb guardian statue in mountain pattern armour, a possible variation of scale armour

Horses covered with scale armour are mentioned in the ancient Chinese book of poetry, Shi Jing.

=== Japan ===
Japanese (samurai) individual scales are called kozane. Japanese scale armour constructed from fish type scales (gyorin kozane) were reportedly constructed in Japan as far back as the Fujiwara period (11th century). "A primitive type of Japanese harness, the single laminae being of boiled leather, cut and beaten into pieces shaped like fish-scales."

=== Borneo ===
Kadazan people in Sabah make armour from scales of the Sunda pangolin.

=== Java ===
The Javanese people has a type of scale armour called siping-siping. It is a protective jacket with scale-shaped metal plates, possibly made of brass.

=== Cheyenne ===
Cheyenne Chieftain Alights on the Cloud wore scale armor of unknown origin into battle.

== Equine scale armour ==
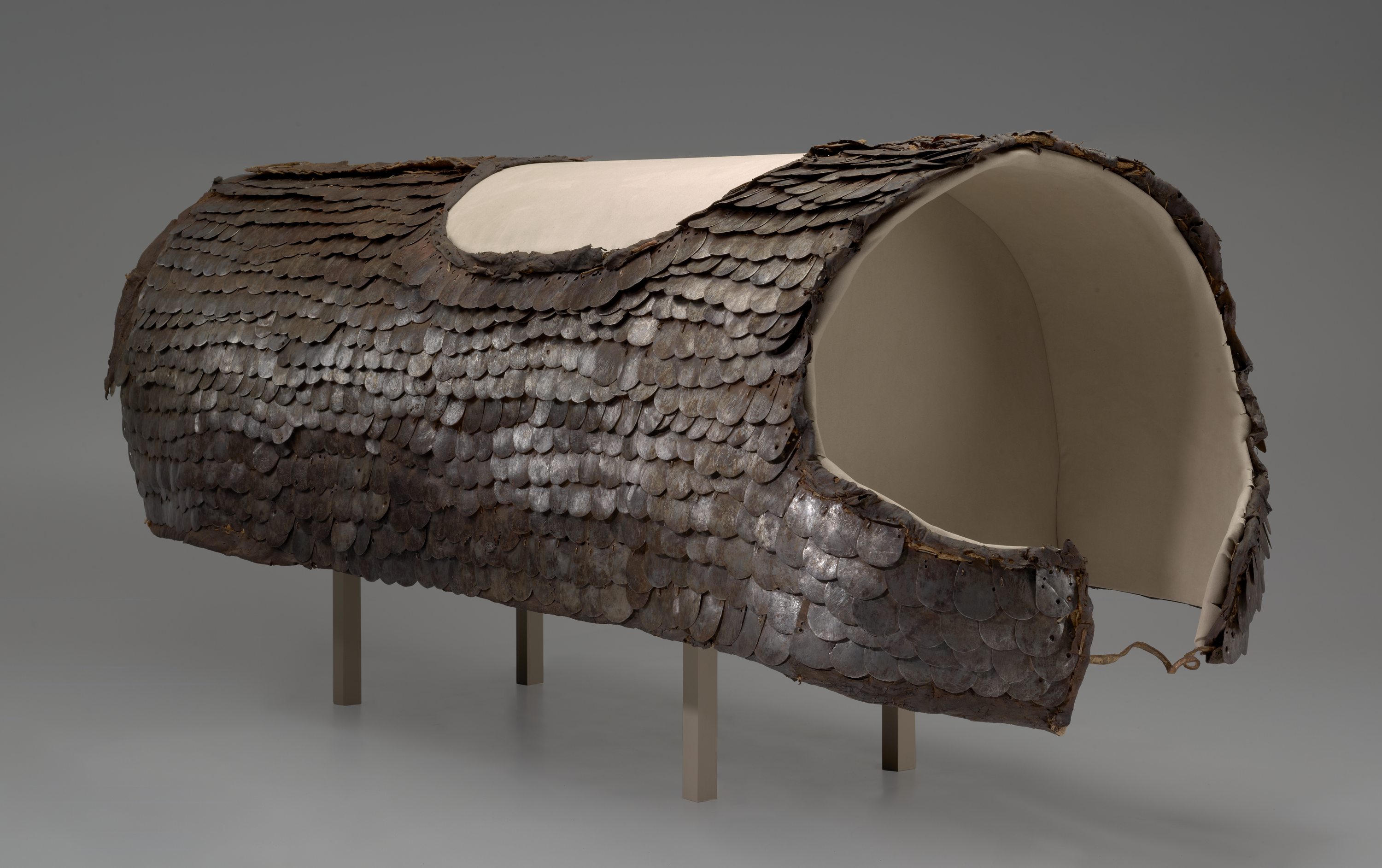
Horse armour found at Dura-Europos

At the ancient site of Dura-Europos, there were two full sets of scale armour for horses found during archaeology excavations. These sets of armour were determined to be from the Roman occupation of the city in the 3rd century CE. They were found in Tower 19, a defensive tower on the edge of the city, after destruction and fire due to defensive tactics. They were folded, one with an arrowhead still in it, and very well preserved. These horse "trappers"—a term used in Simon James's excavation report—were made of a textile base covered by a layer of metal scales, one with iron and one with bronze. As the armour sets were found within the city walls, they are assumed to have belonged to the Romans. However, the style of armour is tied to the Sasanian Empire so there is some confusion as to who the armor belonged to. Also found at Dura-Europos were drawings, or graffiti, that depicted scale armour on horses and cavalrymen.

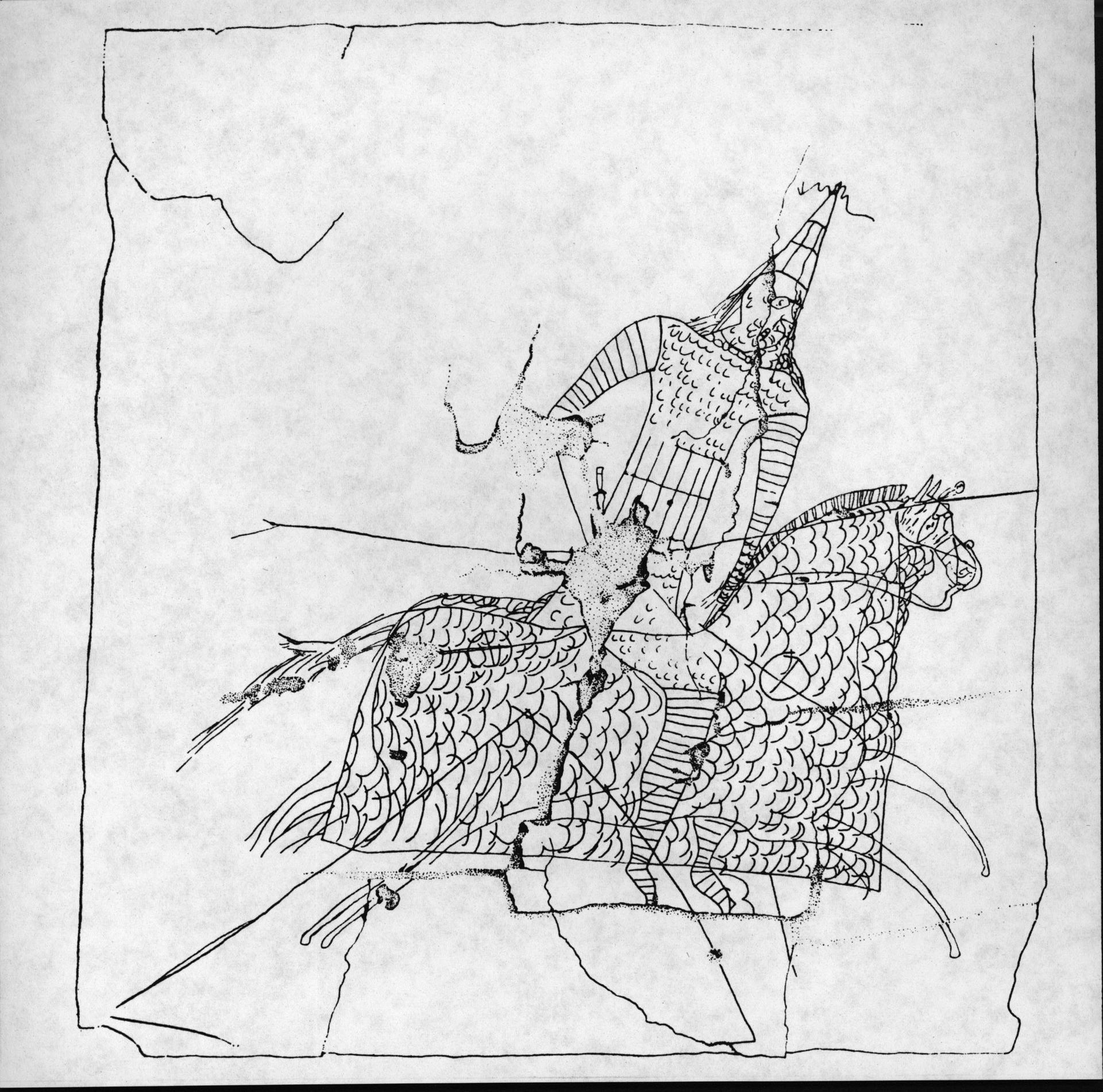
Graffito of Clibanarius, excavated by the Yale-French excavations at Dura-Europos (block M8, Christian Building)

== Comparison with other armour types ==
Scale armour offers better and more solid protection from piercing and blunt attacks than chain mail. It is also cheaper to produce, but it is not as flexible and does not offer the same amount of coverage. Forms other than brigandine and coat of plates were uncommon in medieval Europe, but scale and lamellar remained popular elsewhere.

Modern forms of scale armour are sometimes worn for decorative or LARP purposes, and may be made from materials such as steel, aluminium, or even titanium.

A similar type of modern personal armour is Dragon Skin body armour, which uses ballistic fabric and impact-resistant ceramic plates to protect against pistol and rifle fire. However, its "scales" are not exposed.

== Gallery ==
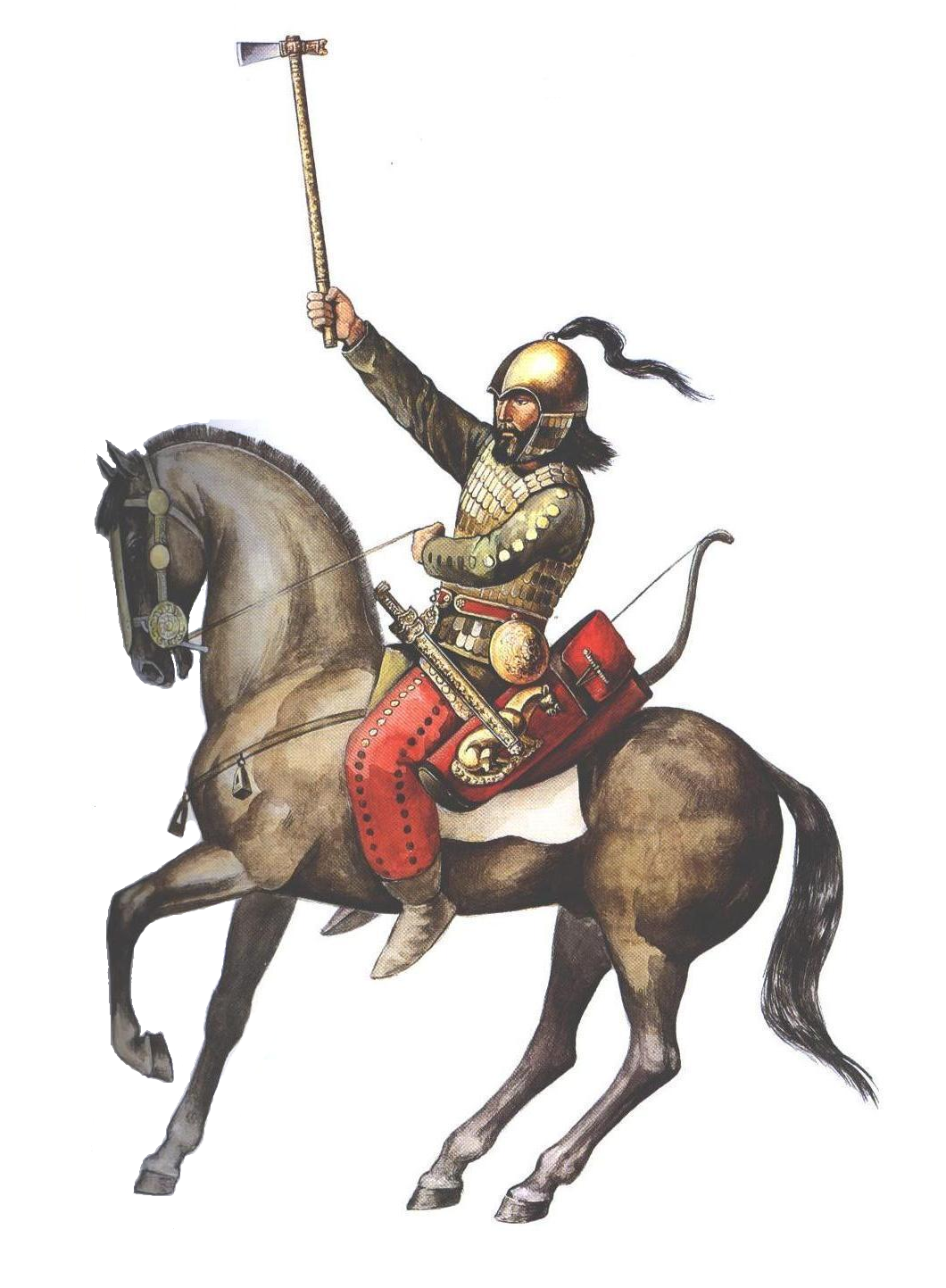
Scythian warrior in bronze scale armour

Examples of early armour construction. The top two sections are examples of scale armour.

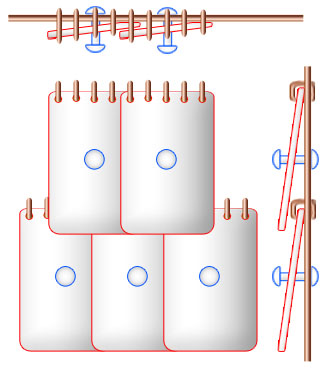
Riveted-laced scale armour. The tops are laced to backing, the centres are loosely riveted. (East-Europe, Kievan Rus and Byzantium)

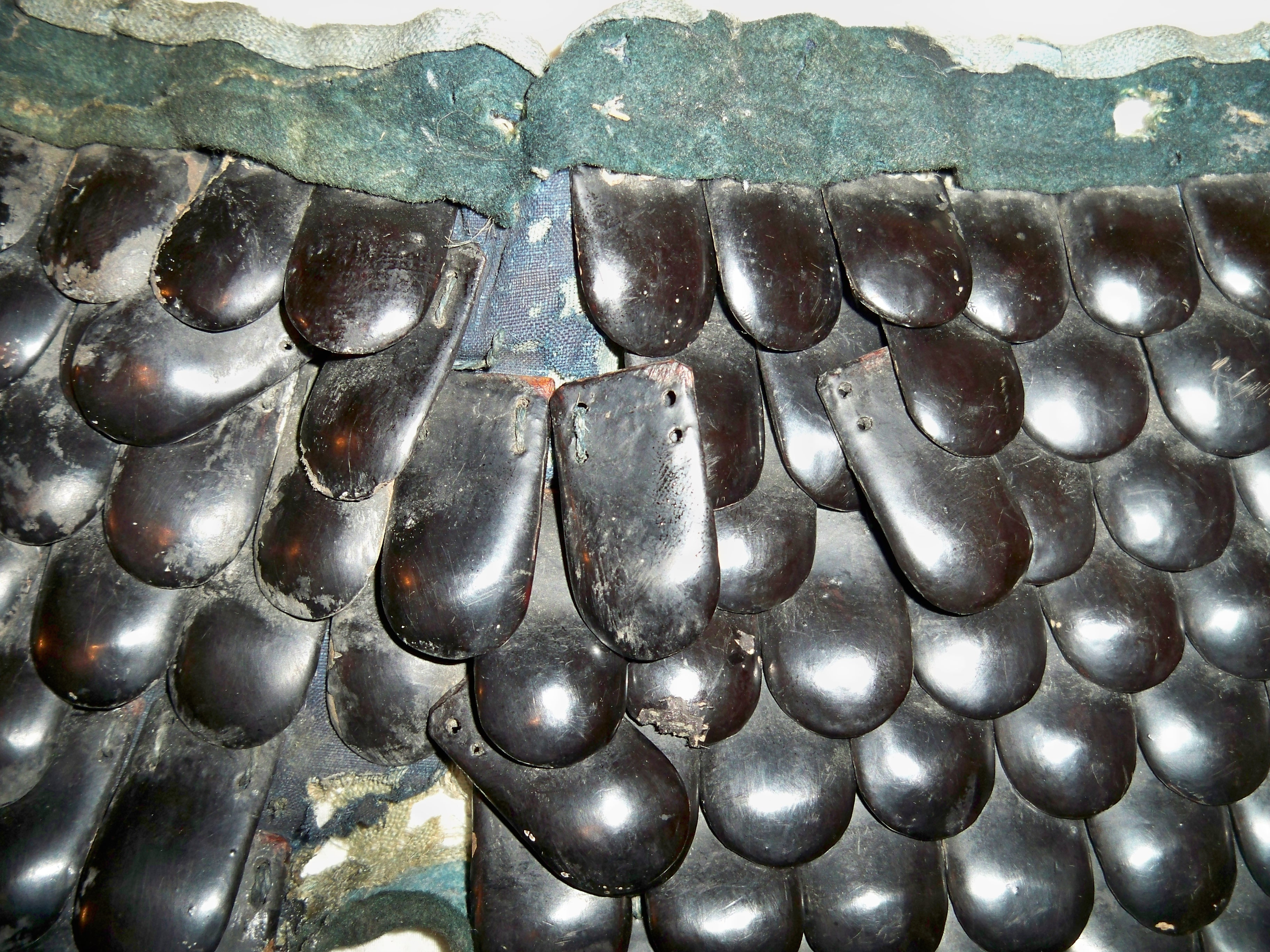
Japanese fishscale armour gyorin kozane, from a helmet neck-guard kabuto shikoro, made from hardened leather

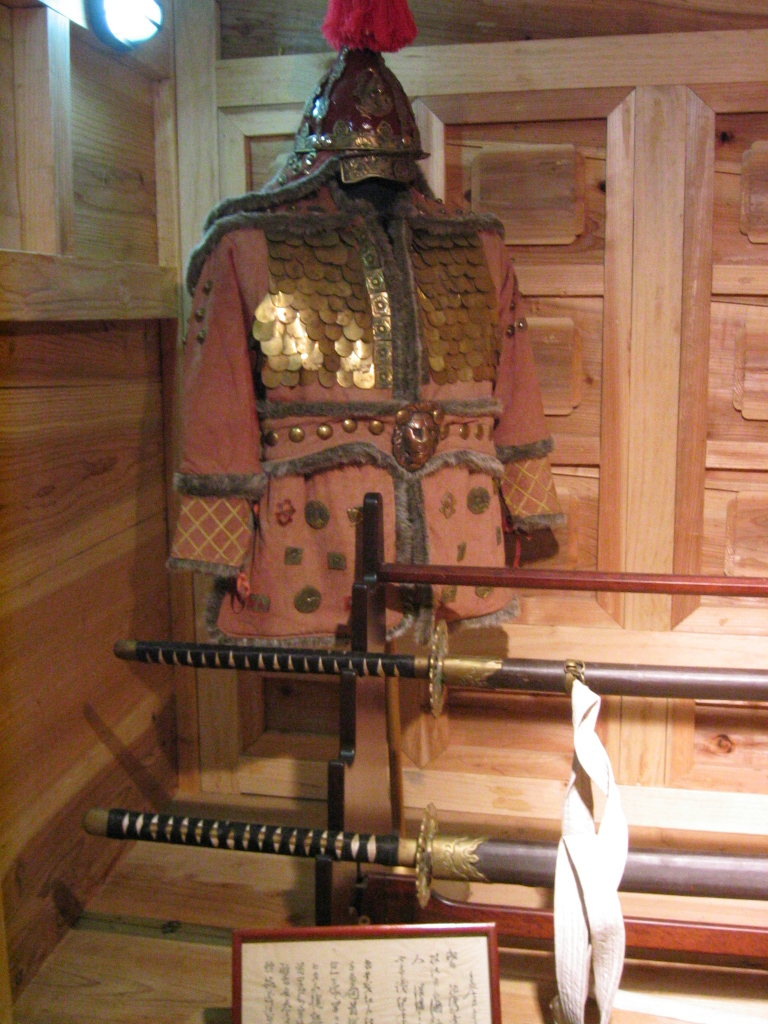
Korean armour made of tin scale (錫鱗甲), displayed at the Danghangpo Tourist Resort, site of the Battle of Danghangpo

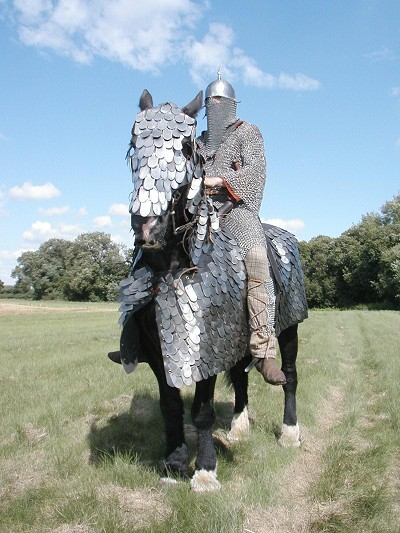
Historical re-enactment of a Sassanid-era cataphract
