= Pteruges =

Decorative leather or fabric strips worn by Roman and Greek soldiers

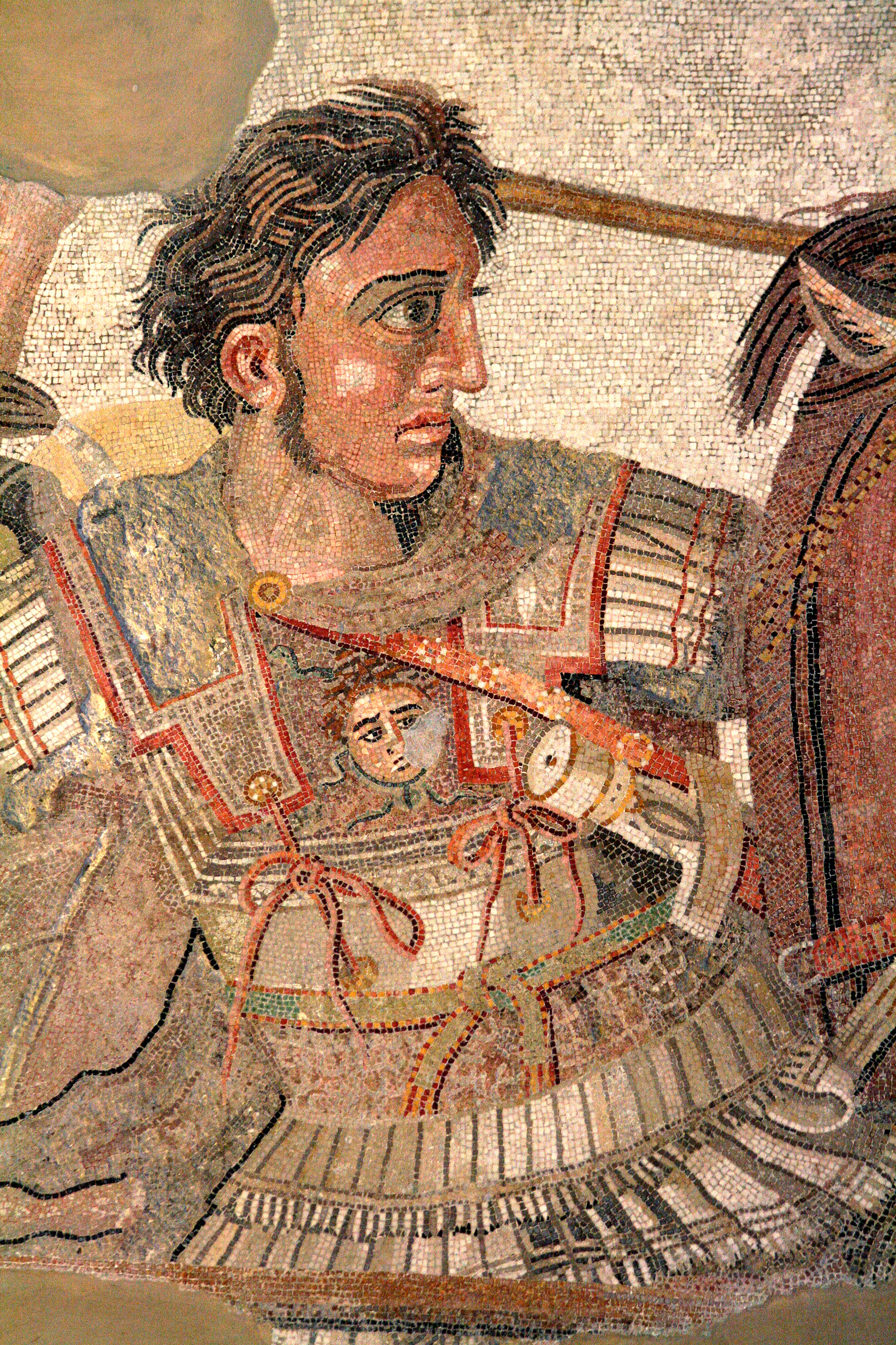
Alexander the Great in battle. Pteruges of leather or stiffened linen are depicted at the shoulders and hips, emerging from beneath his cuirass. Detail of the Alexander Mosaic, a Roman copy of a Hellenistic painting.

Pteruges (also spelled pteryges; from Ancient Greek πτέρυγες (ptéruges) 'feathers') are strip-like defences for the upper parts of limbs attached to armor of the Greco-Roman world.

== Appearance and variation ==
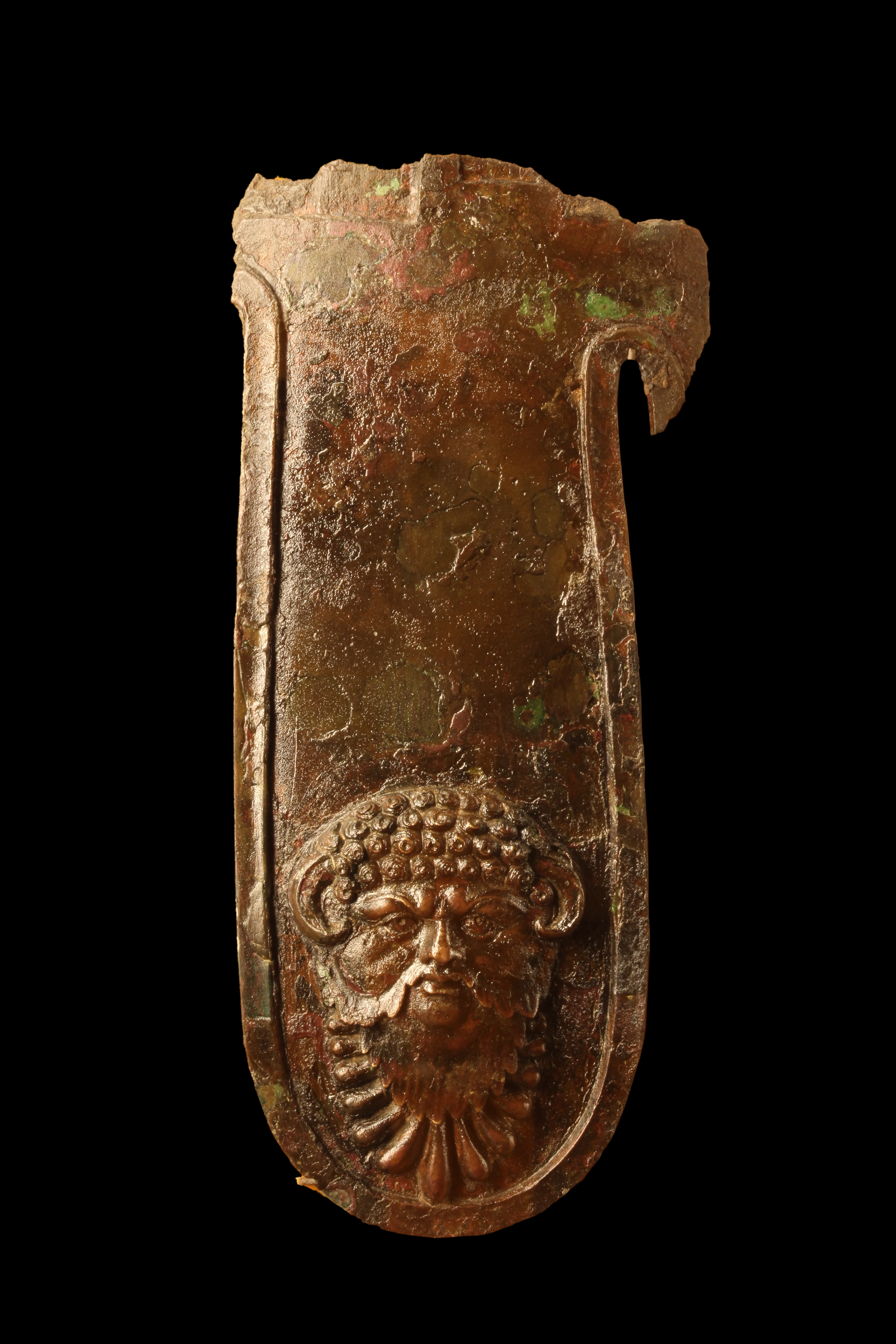
Pteruge featuring the face of Jupiter-Amon at the Museum of Fine Arts of Lyon

Pteruges formed a defensive skirt of leather or multi-layered fabric (linen) strips or lappets worn hanging from the waists of Roman and Greek cuirasses of warriors and soldiers, defending the hips and thighs. Similar defenses, epaulette-like strips, were worn on the shoulders, protecting the upper arms. Both sets of strips are usually interpreted as belonging to a single garment worn under a cuirass, though in a linen cuirass (linothorax) they may have been integral. The cuirass itself could be variously constructed of plate-bronze (muscle cuirass), linothorax, scale, lamellar or mail. Pteruges could be arranged as a single row of longer strips or in two or more layers of shorter, overlapping lappets of graduated length.

== Possible later use ==
During the Middle Ages, especially in the Byzantine Empire and in the Middle East, such strips are depicted descending from the back and sides of helmets, to protect the neck while leaving it reasonably free to move. However, no archaeological remains of leather strip defenses for helmets have been found. Artistic depictions of such strip-like elements can also be interpreted as vertically-stitched quilted textile defenses.

== See also ==
- Roman military personal equipment
- Ancient Roman military clothing

== Bibliography ==
- Gregory S. Aldrete; Scott Bartell; Alicia Aldrete. (2013). Ancient linen body armor : unraveling the linothorax mystery. Baltimore: Johns Hopkins University Press. ISBN 9781421408194.
- Dawson, Timothy (2007). Byzantine Infantryman. Eastern Roman Empire c.900–1204. Osprey. ISBN 978-1-84603-105-2.
