= Sarcina =

Pack carried by Roman legionaries

The sarcina was the marching pack carried by Roman legionaries, the heavy infantry of the Roman legions.

== Origins ==
Most of a legionary's equipment other than his arms and armour would, in early times, have been consigned to a baggage train and borne by mules and carts. The soldiers were also expected to carry much of their rations and equipment themselves. This was done to reduce the size of the baggage train and increase the mobility of the army by allowing the soldiers to move strategically (i.e., quickly and over large distances) independently of the train. Such was the load of the soldiers that they became known as "Marius' mules".

== Contents and appearance ==
The appearance of the marching pack is known from illustrations on Trajan's Column. Here it can be seen that a legionary's sarcina was carried on a pole called a furca and would have included:

- Loculus – a satchel
- Cloak bag
- Cooking pot
- Patera – mess tin
- Netted object

However, this was certainly not the limit of the soldiers load. Time and again, Roman writers emphasise the importance of soldiers being self-sufficient and not tied to the baggage train.

== Historical references ==
The 2nd-century historian Appian of Alexandria records the actions of Scipio Aemilianus Africanus in late 3rd century BC. This was mainly with the objective of improving the morale of the soldiers, but it is also clear that the army is expected to be mobile:

He ordered all wagons and their superfluous contents to be sold, and all pack animals, except such as he designated, to remain. For cooking utensils it was permitted to have only a spit, a brass kettle, and one cup. Their food was limited to plain boiled and roasted meats. They were forbidden to have beds, and Scipio was the first one to sleep on straw. He forbade them to ride on mules when on the march; "for what can you expect in a war," said he, "from a man who is not able to walk?" Those who had servants to bathe and anoint them were ridiculed by Scipio, who said that only mules, having no hands, needed others to rub them.

The 1st-century historian Josephus recorded the items carried in his own time:

besides a saw and a basket, a pick-axe and an axe, a thong of leather and a hook, with provisions for three days, so that a footman hath no great need of a mule to carry his burdens.

The 4th century writer Vegetius advises that:

The legion is provided with iron hooks, called wolves, and iron scythes fixed to the ends of long poles; and with forks, spades, shovels, pickaxes, wheelbarrows and baskets for digging and transporting earth; together with hatchets, axes and saws for cutting wood.

Vegetius was not clear that the soldiers were required to carry these items personally, but it is known that soldiers were required to carry entrenching tools (such as the dolabra) and turf cutters for the construction of a temporary camp at the end of each day's march. Probably a variety of tools and equipment was carried distributed among the members of a contubernium. They may also have carried baskets and one or more sudes (stakes).

== Images ==
There have been many attempts to reconstruct the sarcina and its component parts for historical reenactment.

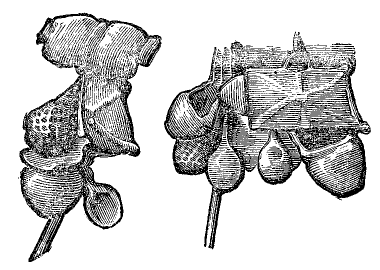
Sarcina as illustrated on Trajan's Column

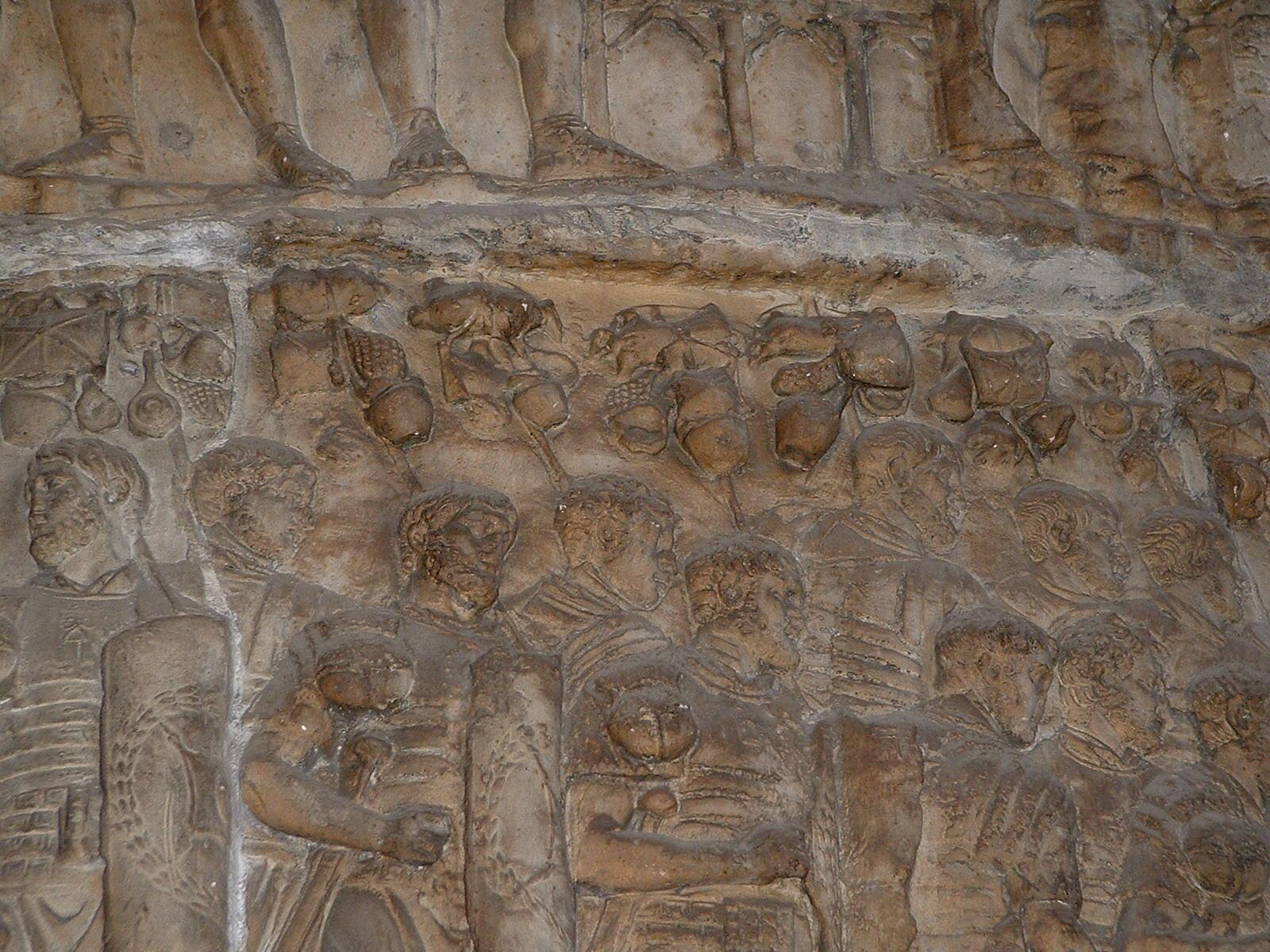
Soldiers with marching packs on Trajan's Column

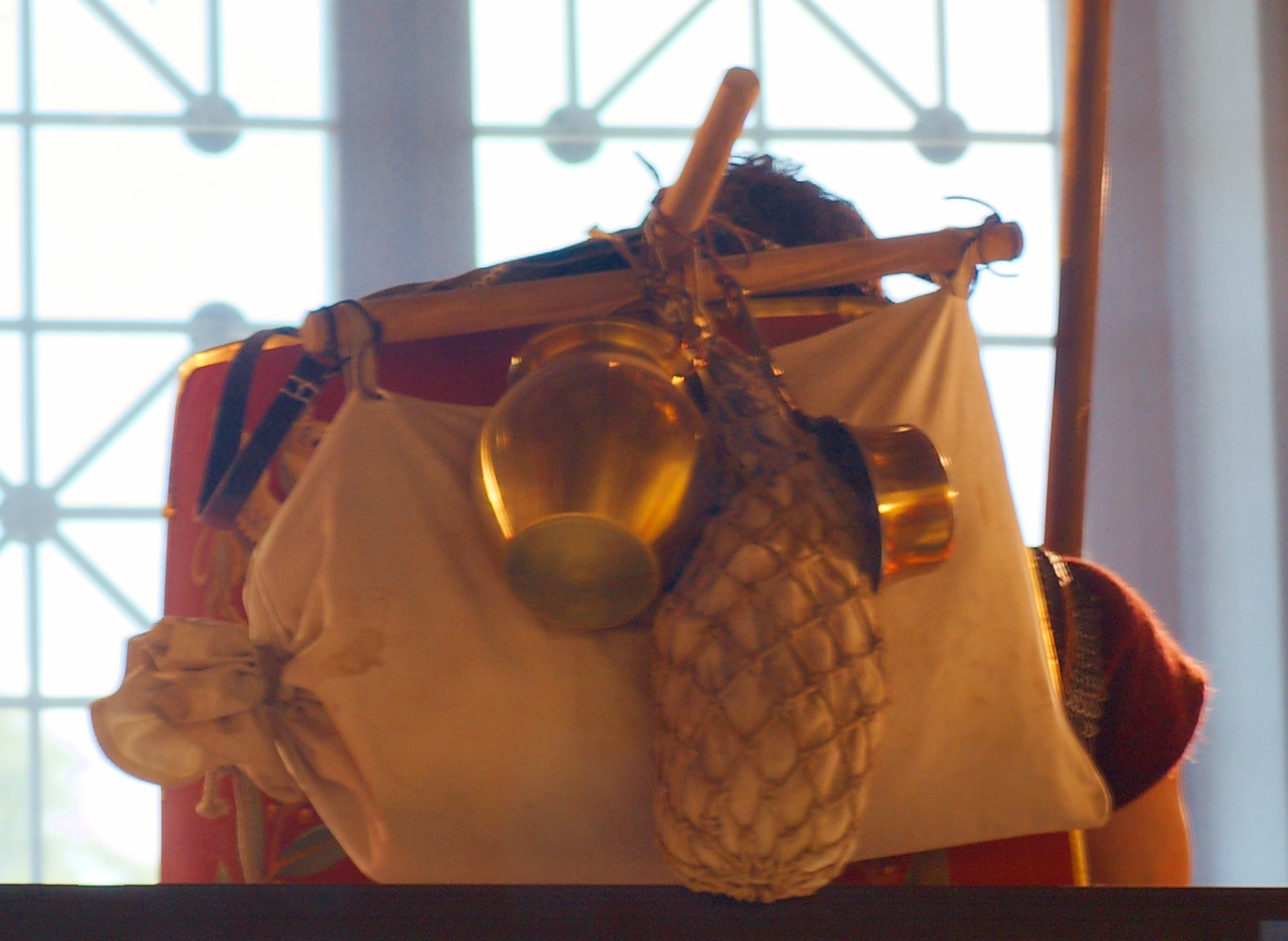
Reconstruction

== General and cited references ==
- Connolly, Peter (2012). Greece and Rome at War. Barnsley, S. Yorkshire, UK: Frontline Books Books. ISBN 9781848326095.
