= Lorica segmentata =

Plate armor used in Ancient Rome

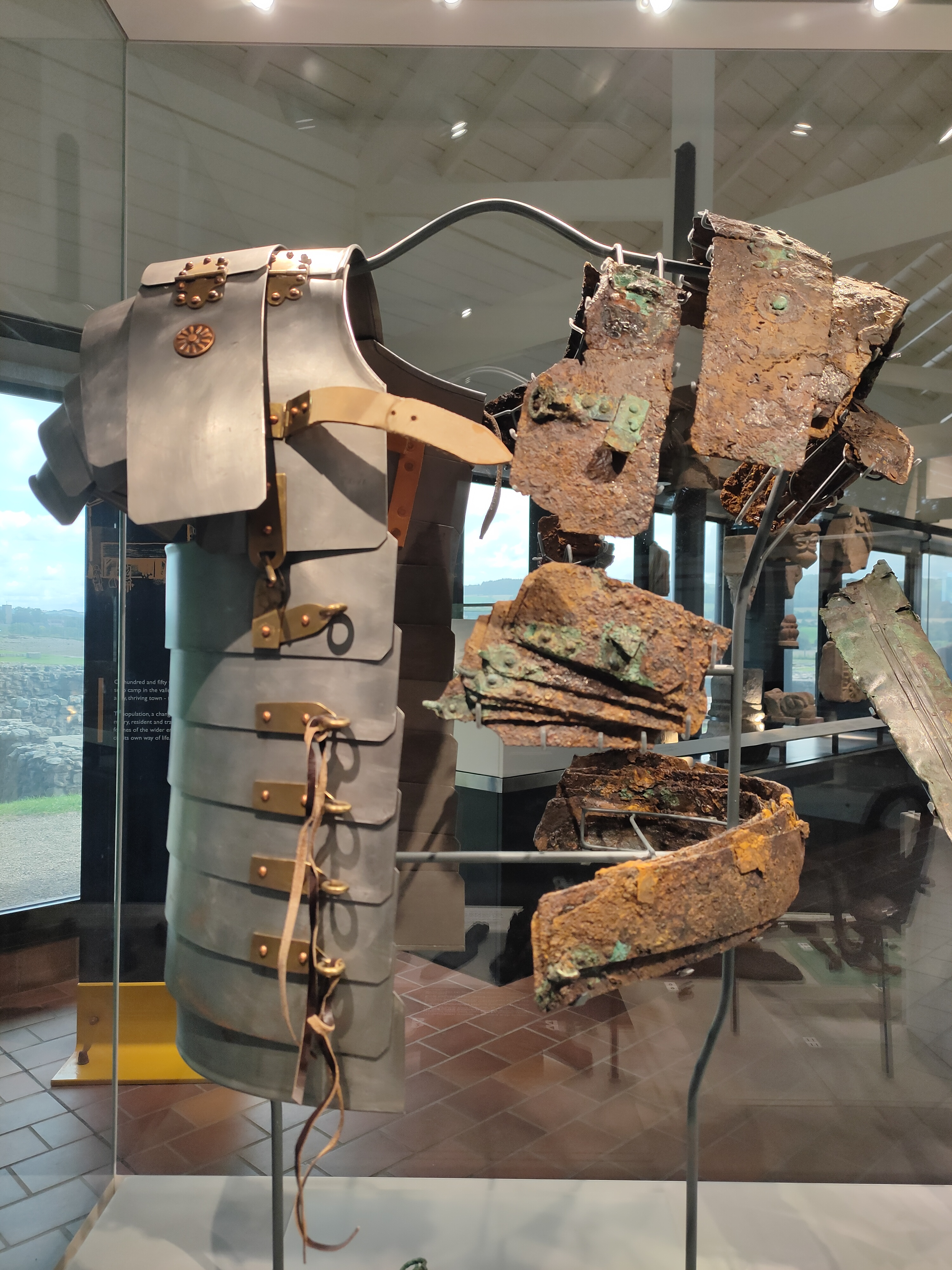
Remains and recreation of lorica segmentata, from the Corbridge Hoard.

The lorica segmentata (Latin pronunciation: [ɫoːˈriːka]), also called lorica lamminata, or banded armor is a type of personal armor used by soldiers of the Roman army, consisting of metal strips fashioned into overlapping or interlocking circular bands, fastened internally and held in place on the body with leather straps. Torso armor of this type was probably in use by various Roman legions from approximately the beginning of the 1st century AD, until at least the mid part of the 3rd century AD.

The lorica segmentata is widely associated with Roman legionaries in popular culture depictions, though it was not widely used in the history of Roman civilization.

== Etymology ==
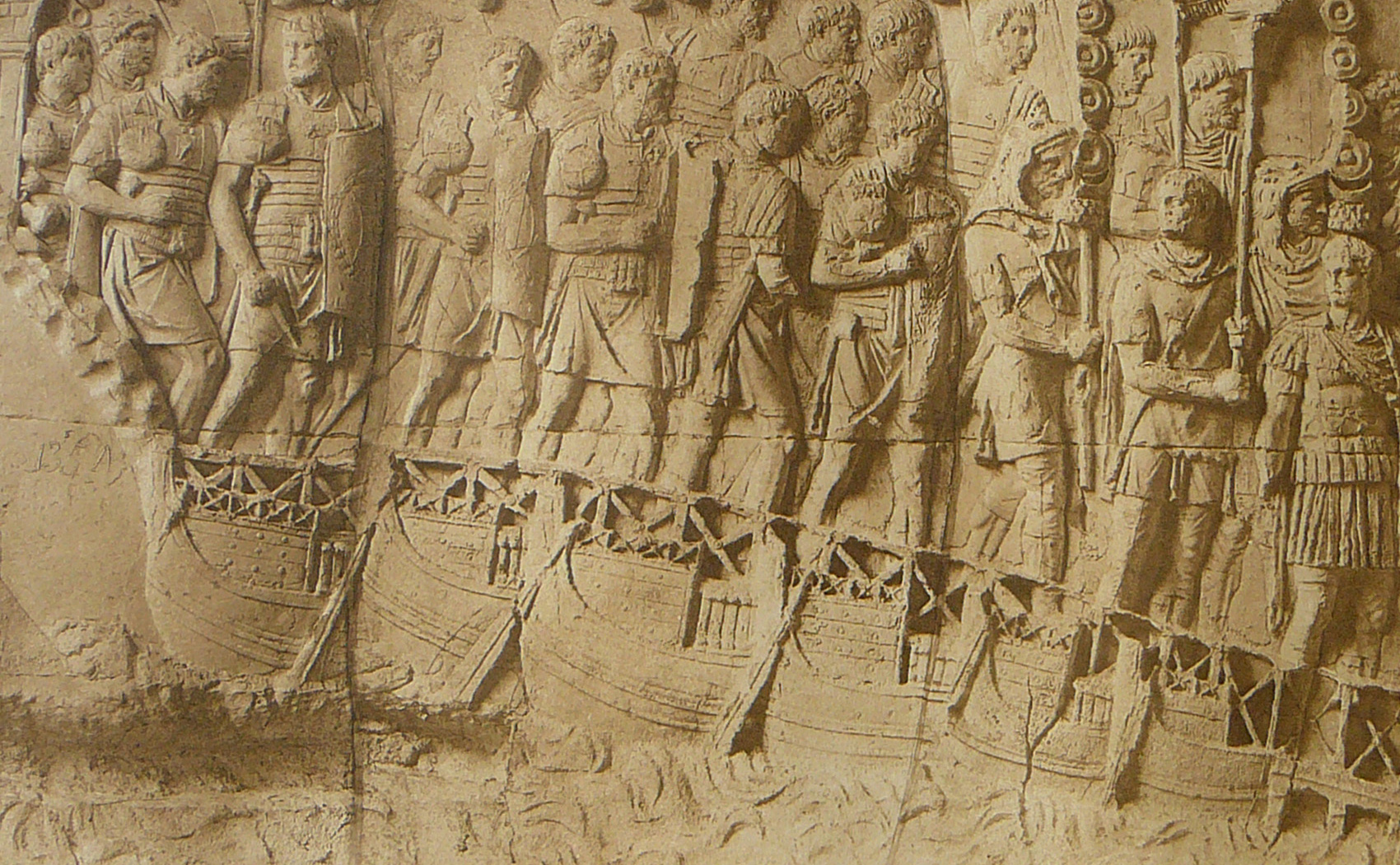
Roman legionaries marching across a pontoon bridge, a relief scene from the column of Emperor Trajan (r. 98-117 AD) in Rome, Italy (monochrome photographs by Conrad Cichorius)

In Latin, the name lorica segmentata translates to "segmented cuirass". However, this name was not given to the armor by the Romans. Instead, it was given by scholars in the 16th century. Despite the lack of knowledge on the Roman name for the armor, scholars can make educated guesses on the Roman name. It is obvious the name had the word lorica in it. However, the following part of the name is unknown. Some scholars believe that the name was lorica lamminata. This theory is based on the Romans referring to sheets of metal as lamina, although no firm evidence for any theory regarding the name of the armor currently exists.

== History ==
Despite the armor being commonly associated with the Romans, the technology behind the lorica segmentata was old by the time it was introduced into the Roman infantry. The Dendra panoply is an example from the 15th century BC of articulated plate defense using a similar technique of overlapping curved plates. Laminated armor was also used by the Parthians and possibly the Dacians, Scythians, or Sarmatians before the Romans adopted it. Some sets of limb armor of this type combined with scale armor dating back to the 4th century BC have been found in archaeological sites located in the steppe. It is possible the Manica (armguard) was worn by gladiators before it was introduced for military use.

Although the exact time at which the Romans adopted the armor remains unknown, it is possible that the lorica segmentata was introduced after Crassus' defeat at Carrhae in 53 BC. Another possibility is that the armor was adopted in 21 AD after the Revolt of Julius Sacrovir and Julius Florus. Since an archeological research conducted in Kalkriese confirmed that the soldiers at the Battle of the Teutoburg Forest in 9 AD wore the lorica segmentata, it is assumed that this armor must have been in use before 9 AD.

Around the middle of the third century the lorica segmentata fell out of favor with the Roman army, although it did remain in use during the Late Roman Empire. Soldiers wearing the lorica segmentata were depicted on the Arch of Constantine, a monument erected in Rome in 315. However, it has been argued that these depictions are from an earlier monument by Marcus Aurelius, from which Constantine the Great incorporated portions into his Arch. The latest known use of the armor was therefore in the 4th century.

Over time the type of lorica segmentata would change. From 9 BC to 43 AD the Roman soldier wore the Dangstetten-Kalkriese-Vindonissa types, from 69 to 100 the Corbridge-Carnuntum type was used. From 164 to 180, the Newstead type was used. The times over which these varieties of armor were used overlapped. It is possible that there was a fourth type, covering the body with segmented armor joined to scale shoulder defenses; however, this is only known from one badly damaged statue originating at Alba Iulia in Romania. This last type of armor was used from about 14 BC perhaps until the early 4th century AD.

The lorica segmentata's use in the Roman army was geographically widespread, but the mail armor lorica hamata may have been more common at all times.

== Construction ==
The plates in the lorica segmentata armor were made by overlapping ferrous plates that were then riveted to straps made from leather. It is unknown what animal was used to make the leather and if it was tanned or tawed. The plates were made of soft iron on the inside and rolled mild steel on the outside. This made the plates hardened against damage without making them brittle. This case-hardening was done by packing organic matter tightly around them and heating them in a forge, transferring carbon from the burnt materials into the surface of the metal. The plates were made from beating out ingots.

The strips were arranged horizontally on the body, overlapping downwards, and they surrounded the torso in two halves, being fastened at the front and back. Additional strips, shoulder guards, breastplates, and backplates were used to protect the upper body and the shoulders. The form of the armor allowed it to be stored very compactly, since it was possible to separate it into four sections, each of which would collapse on itself into a compact mass. The fitments that closed the various plate sections together (buckles, lobate hinges, hinged straps, tie-hooks, tie-rings, etc.) were made of brass. In later variants dating from around 75–80 AD, the fastenings of the armor were simplified.

Bronze hinges were removed in favor of simple rivets, belt fastenings used small hooks, and the lowest two girdle plates were replaced by one broad plate. The component parts of the lorica segmentata moved in synchronization with the other parts. This made the armor more flexible. The armor was very long lasting. The Kalkriese type of armor lasted 55 years, the Corbridge armor lasted 70 years, and the Newstead type lasted 90 years.

== Usage ==
It is unclear who used this armor. On monuments, Auxilia are generally shown wearing mail, not cuirasses, and carrying oval shields. Roman depictions of legionaries, such as those found on Trajan's column often depict them wearing the lorica segmentata. On this basis, it has been supposed that lorica segmentata was exclusively used by legionaries and praetorians. However, some historians consider Trajan's Column to be inaccurate as a historical source due to its inaccurate and stylized portrayal of Roman armor. These historians also say that "it is probably safest to interpret the Column reliefs as 'impressions', rather than accurate representations."

The discovery of parts of the lorica segmentata at areas where auxiliary soldiers would have been stationed implies that auxiliary troops used the lorica segmentata. However, it is entirely possible that the reason behind the presence of the lorica segmentata in these areas could be that these areas had a small number of legionaries stationed there. On the Adamclisi Tropaeum, the lorica segmentata does not appear at all, and legionaries and auxilia alike are depicted wearing the lorica squamata. Some experts are of the opinion that the Adamclisi monument is a more accurate portrayal of the situation.

It may have been used rarely, maybe only for set-piece battles and parades. This viewpoint considers the figures in Trajan's Column to be highly stereotyped, in order to distinguish clearly between different types of troops. It is also debated if the lorica segmentata was only used in the west. All archaeological finds of such armor has been made in 16 countries in the western part of the Roman Empire but never in the east.

== Cultural impact ==
The tendency to portray Roman legionaries clad in this type of armor, including in popular culture, often extends to periods of time that are too early or too late to be consistent with what is known of the actual historical use of such armor.

== Gallery ==
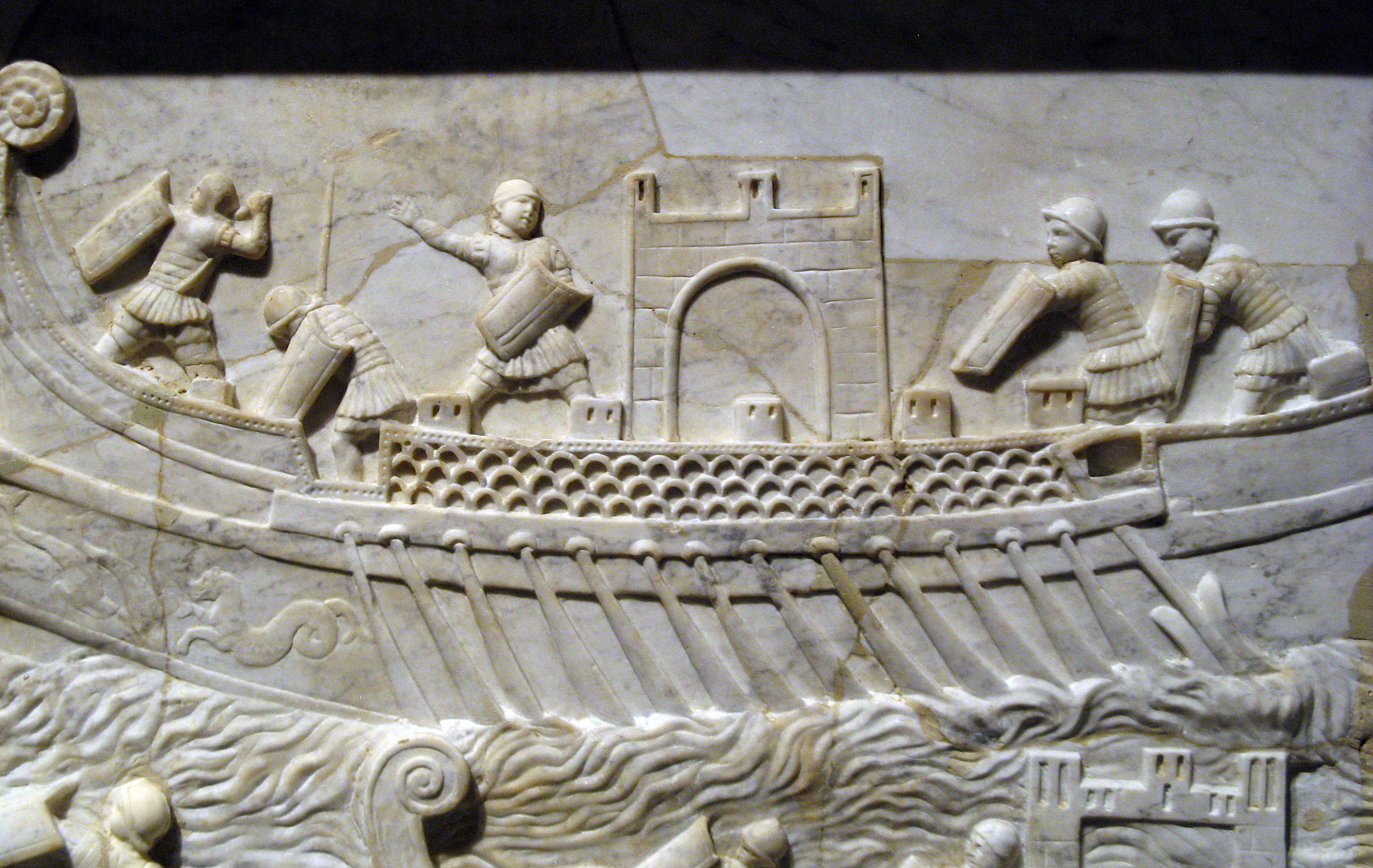
Relief from the first half of the 1st century depicting the naval battle at Actium

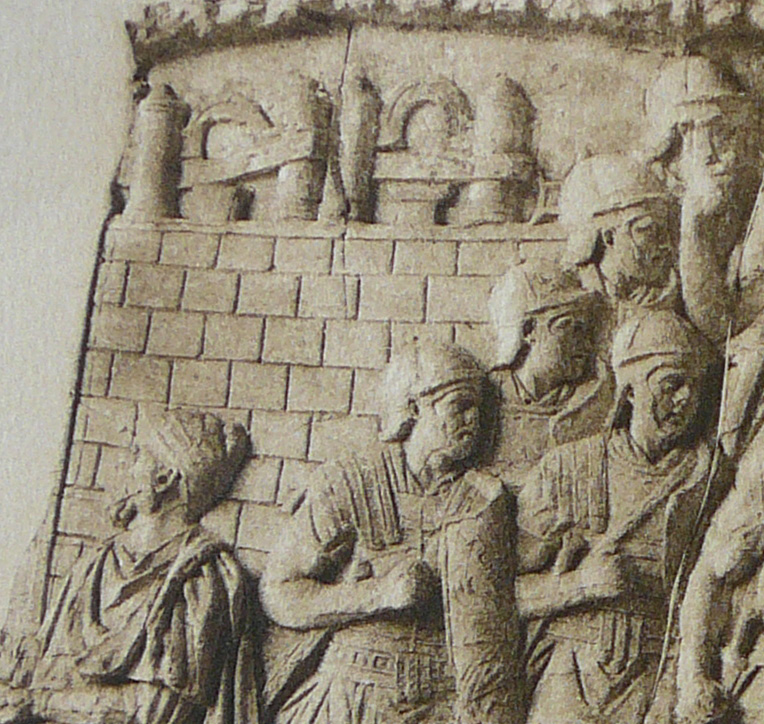
Detail of Trajan's Column

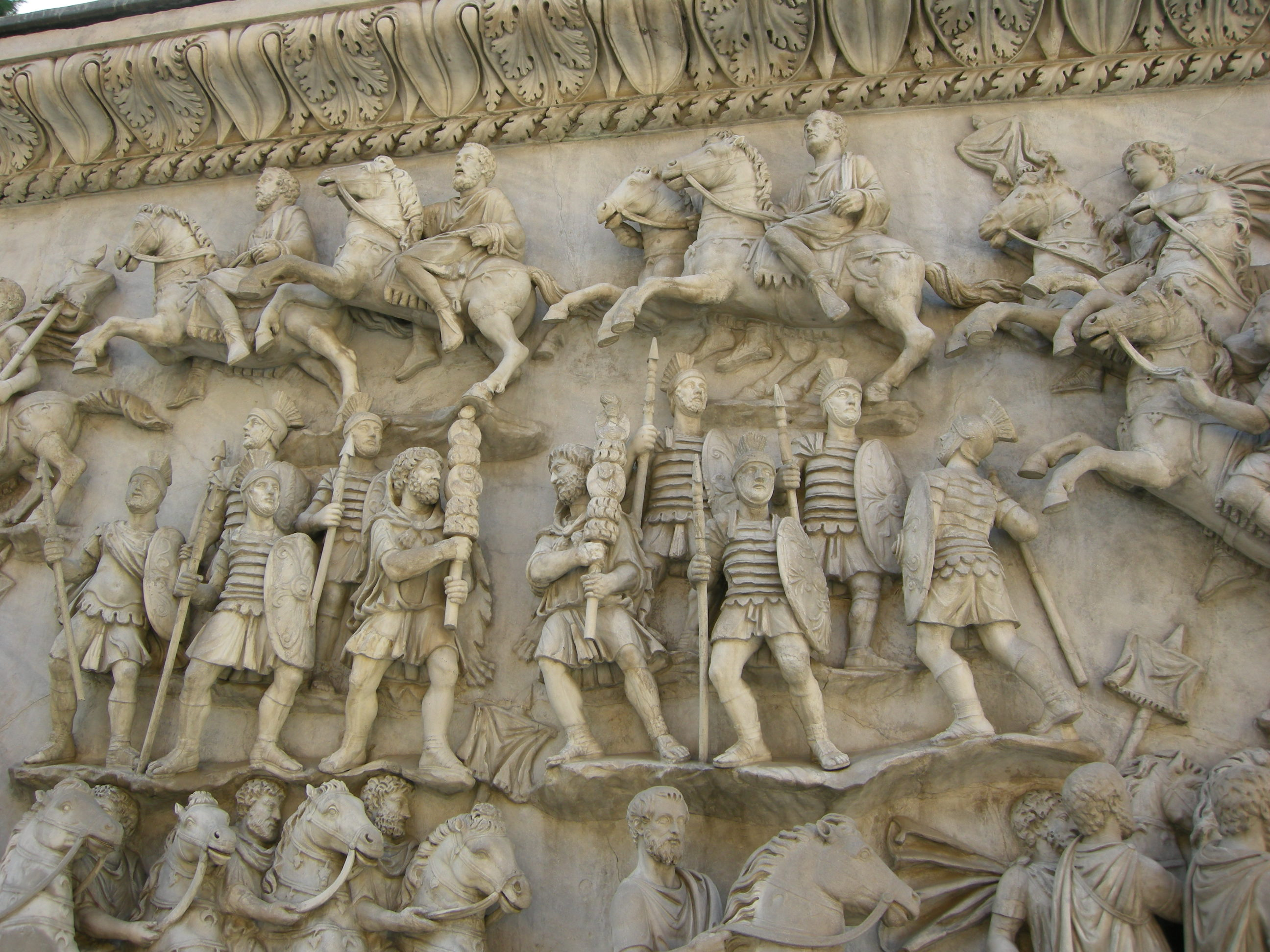
High relief on base of the Column of Antoninus Pius

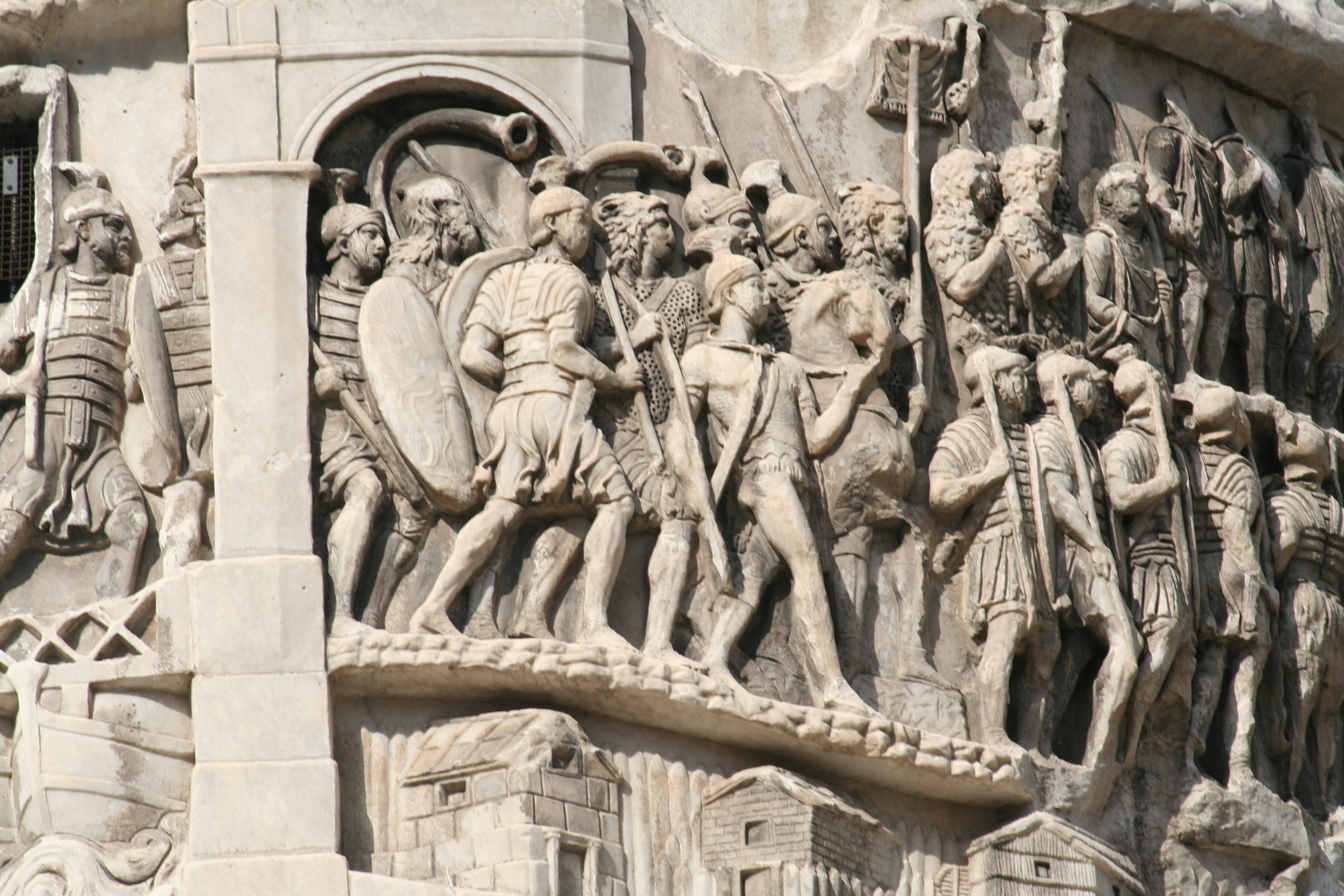
Roman legionaries as depicted in relief on the column of Emperor Marcus Aurelius (r. 161–180 AD) in Rome, Italy

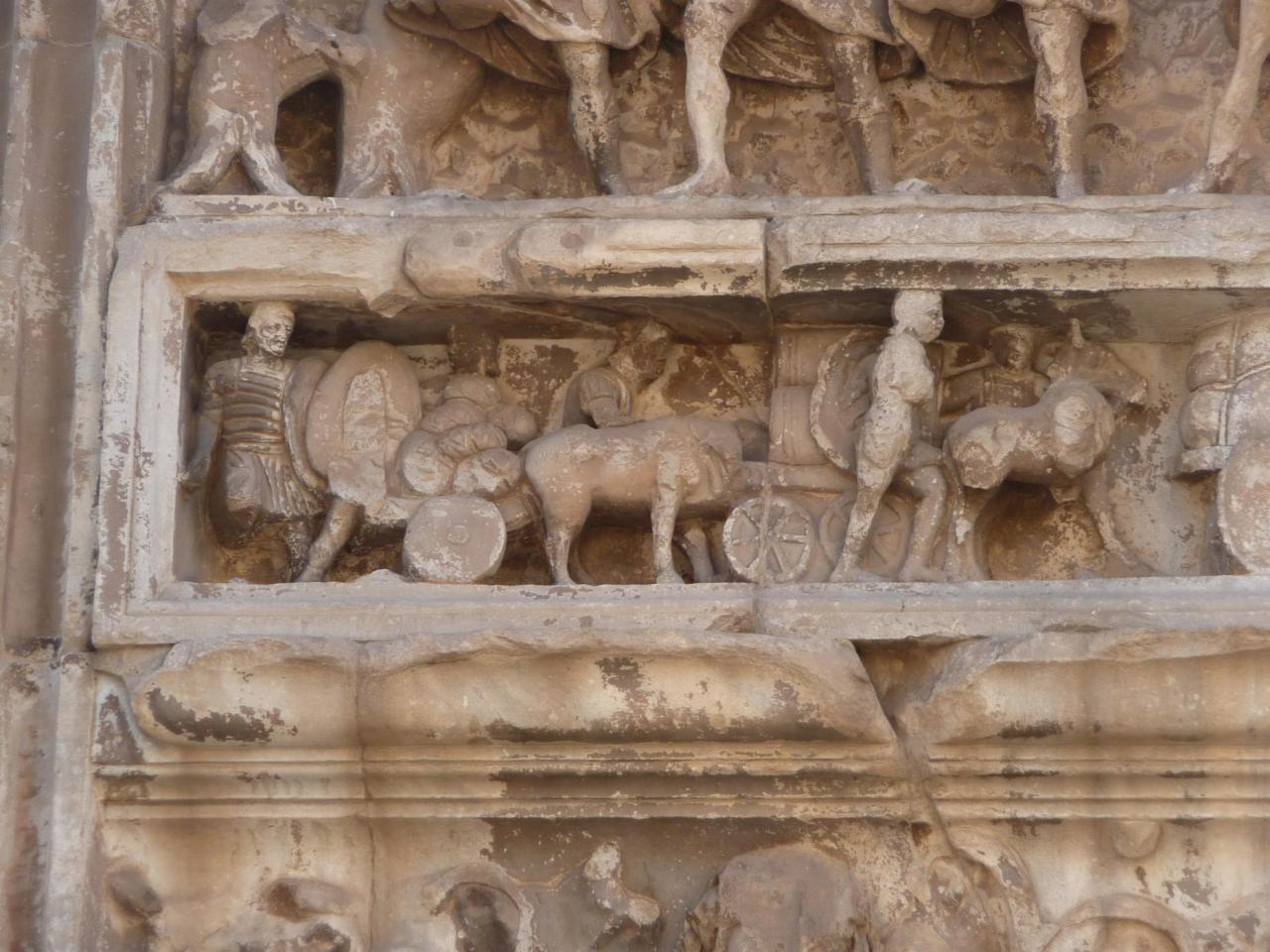
Detail of an Arch of Septimius Severus

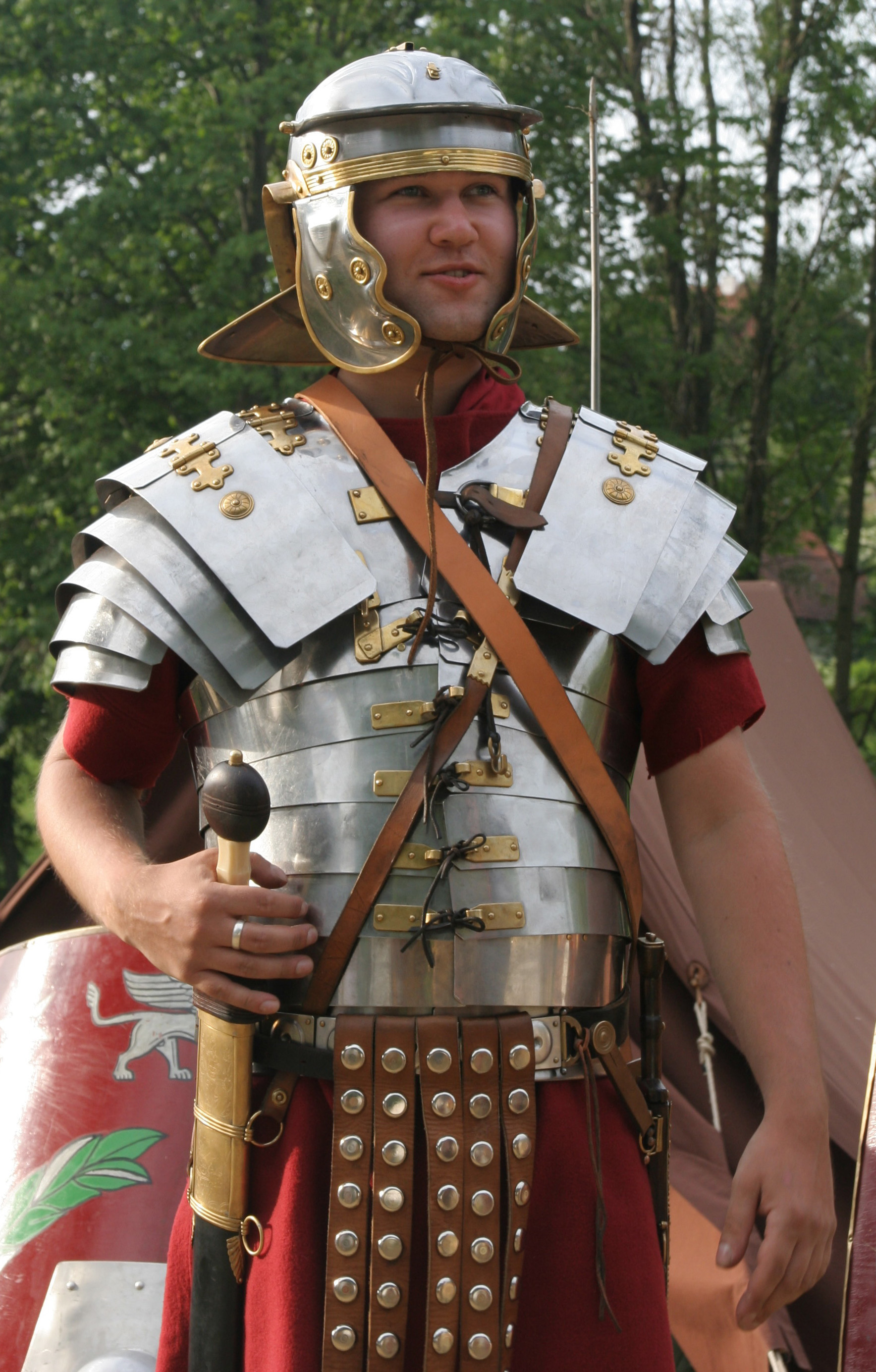
A reenactor dressed as a Roman soldier in lorica segmentata

== See also ==
- Corbridge Hoard – Hoard of artefacts excavated in England
- Lorica hamata – Style of chain mail used by Roman Army
- Lorica plumata – Roman armour
- Lorica squamata – Roman armour
- Manica (armguard) – Component of late antique armor

== Bibliography ==
- D'Amato, Raffaele; Sumner, Graham (2009). Arms And Armour of the Imperial Roman Soldier. Barnsley: Frontline Books. ISBN 978-1848325128.
- Travis, Hilary; Travis, John (2011). Roman Body Armour. Amberley Publishing. ISBN 978-1-4456-0359-9.
