= Lorica plumata =

Roman armour

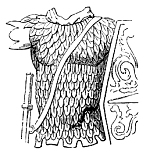
Illustration of Lorica Plumata after ancient monument

The lorica plumata (Latin: [loːr̺iːka pluːmaːt̪a]; Latin for 'feathered cuirass'), also called the lorica hamata squamatque (Latin for 'hooked and scaled cuirass'), was a set of Roman body armor. Unlike the more common lorica squamata, the scales of this cuirass bore a ridge down the middle, like a feather shaft, from which the name derives.

The lorica plumata was sleeveless and worn without spaulders (shoulder guards), resembling a linothorax. Due to its rarity and higher production and maintenance costs, it may have been reserved for higher-ranking soldiers, tribune or above. The lorica plumata would have been an expensive piece of military equipment. Unlike most contemporary Roman armor, it combined mail and scales.

== History ==
Originally a Sarmatian armor. Reference to this armor was made by the historian Marcus Junianus Justinus. He explains that the armor was used for soldiers and horses. and protected the whole body. Based on a set found in Vize, Turkey, it was already in use by the middle first century AD, and remained so through the middle third century. At the Battle of Lake Trasimene the consul Flaminius's armor is described as "a coat of mail with, attached to it, wrought iron scales mingled with gold", which matches the design of lorica plumata. It continued to be used up to the Marcomannic Wars.

== Current sets of armor ==
One fragment of this armor was allegedly found near Rome, and ultimately donated to the Altes Museum in Berlin. Another incomplete set is held at the Roman Museum in Augsburg. The Istanbul Archaeological Museum has a complete set of the armor, found in Vize. Other pieces were found in Ouddorp, Usk, Xanten, Dülük Baba Tepesi, and Mandeure, alongside several other pieces of unclear origin. Most come from northern Europe, in the border territories of the Roman Empire, but this may arise from greater archaeological attention on these regions and increased Roman activity near the Limes Germanicus. Identifying lorica plumata can also be a challenge, which may artificially reduce its apparent prevalence.

== Usage in the Roman army ==
Its battlefield utility has been questioned, even to the point of claims that it was for parade use only, as the components are small and can be fragile. This view has been criticized, as there is no evidence of a Roman concept of parade armor, sets and fragments of lorica plumata have been found near armor used for battle or locations where battle would be expected, and modern standards for armor strength and durability may not match those of the ancient Roman Empire.

== Forging ==
The 160 to 350,000 rings in the mail are arranged in alternating rows of oval-shaped riveted and solid rings made from either iron or a copper alloy. Riveted links are inserted into each hole, thus attaching the mail to the rings. In order to insert the rivet, they flattened the rings that overlapped with other rings with an awl. The rows of rings were overlapped left to right. Afterwards, the blacksmiths would perforate the lap using hammers and anvils. The holes were round at first, but during the forging process they were stretched by the force of the inserted rivets. This resulted in the rivet being clamped solidly into the ring. The rivets were made by cutting copper strips to the required length. The rings were made by punching out sheet metal or by welding out wire.

For every two rows of rings there was a horizontal row of loose scales. The armor was covered by 20 to 30,000 very small scales that were unlike any Roman scales. Each scale was folded to leave a 90° angle at the top. Four small holes can be found in the ledge formed by the angle. Some scales were superimposed downwards and arranged vertically. The scales had a rib down the center. These ribbed scales would have been metallic. Scales were used in the design of the armor because they are lightweight, strong, tough, and flexible. With overlapping scales, if parts of the armor are broken, the wearer is still protected. The result of this design would have been a heavy, highly flexible set of armor. It was so flexible because its components were very small, allowing them to bend easily.

== See also ==
- Lorica segmentata
- Lorica hamata
- Lorica squamata
- Manica (armguard)
