= Loculus (satchel) =

Satchel carried by Roman soldiers

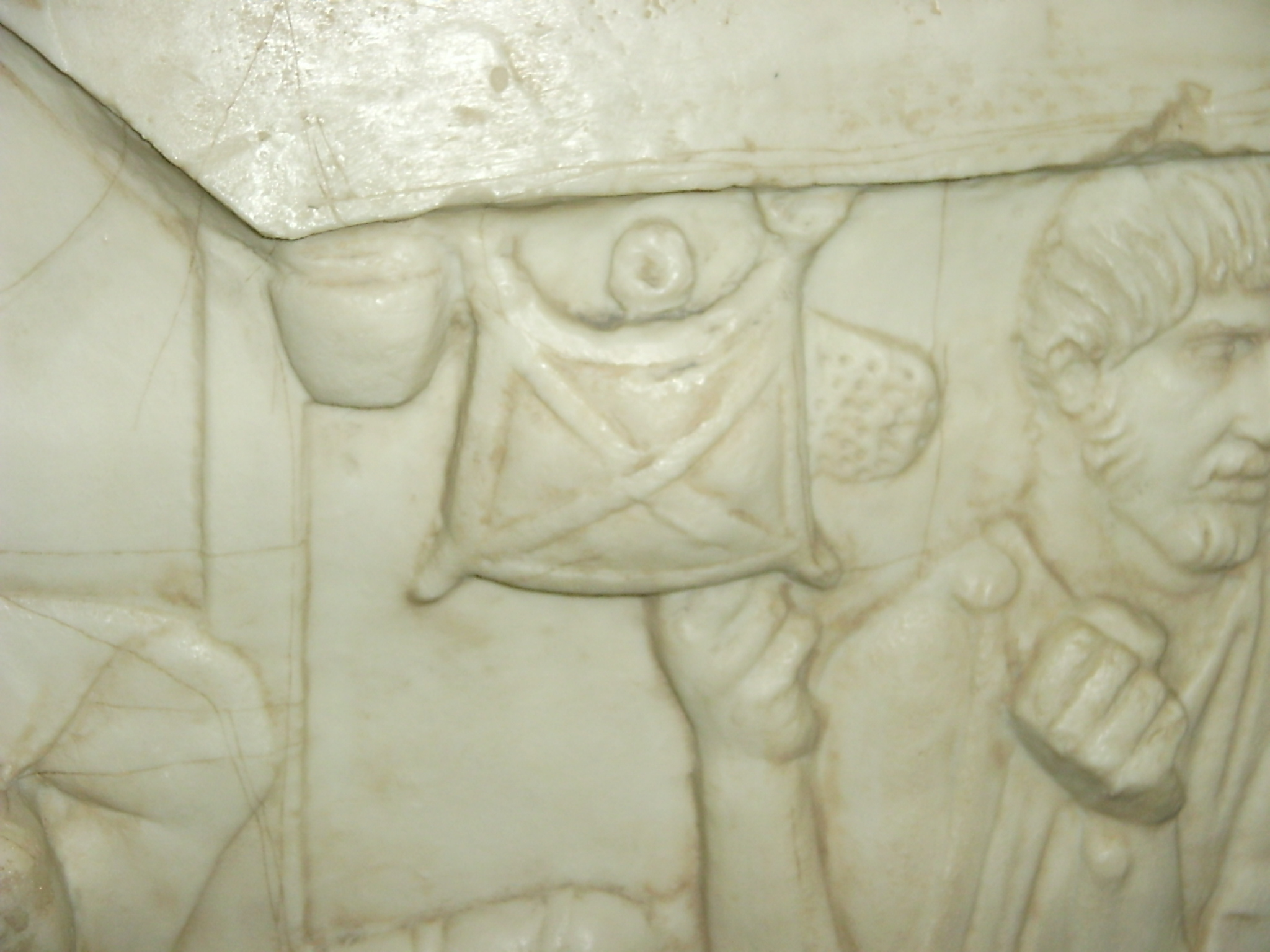
Loculus illustrated on Trajan's Column, hung from the canopy of a boat

Loculus is a Latin word literally meaning little place and was used to indicate a type of satchel. These satchels were carried by Roman soldiers as a part of their sarcina or luggage.

A loculus satchel is believed to have been made with the hide of a goat or calf and reinforced with diagonal straps. The satchel featured a bronze ring with a central stud to hold it closed, and two bronze rings on the upper corners allowed the bag to be easily hung from a shoulder pole. The loculus would have been used to carry a soldier's rations and personal items.
