= Lorica hamata =

Style of chain mail used by Roman Army

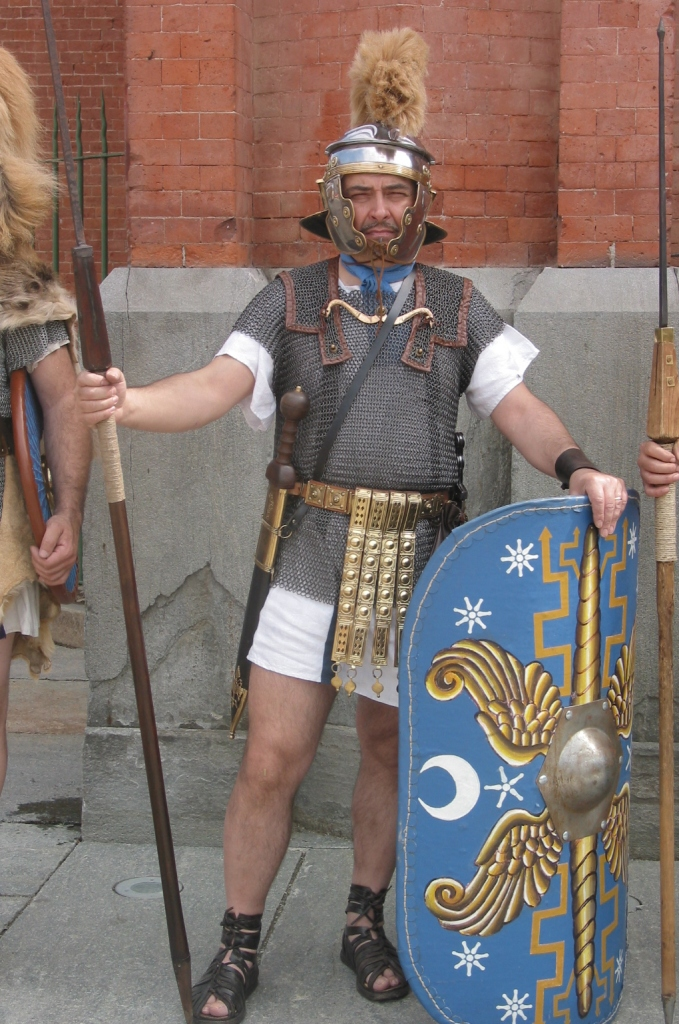
Reconstruction of a Roman legionary

The lorica hamata (in Latin with normal elision: [loːr̺iːk‿(h)aːmaːt̪a]) is a type of mail armor used by soldiers for over 600 years (3rd century BC to 4th century AD) from the Roman Republic to the Roman Empire. Lorica hamata comes from the Latin hamatus (hooked) from hamus which means "hook", as the rings hook into one another.

== Usage ==
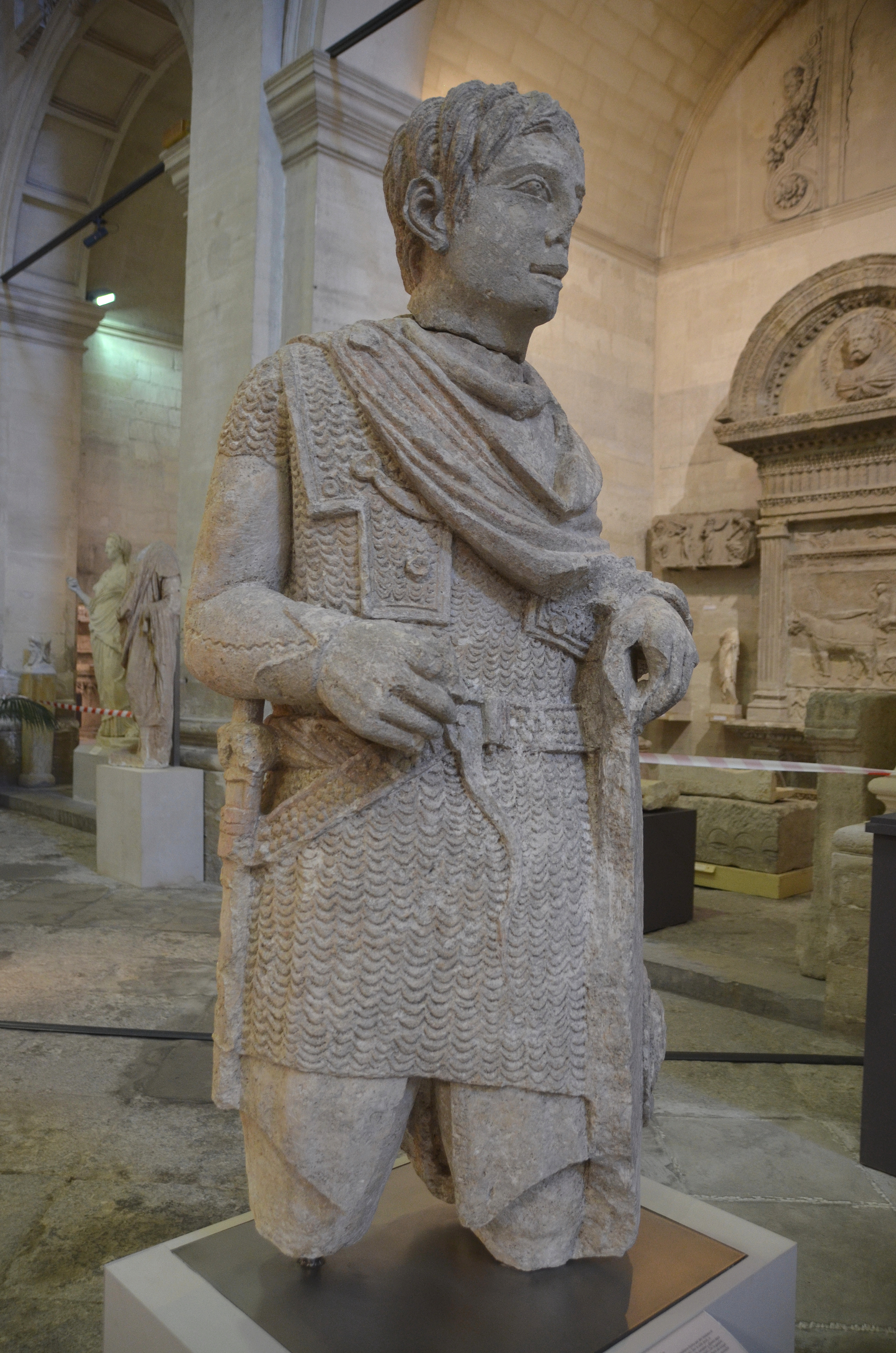
Augustan period statue of a Gaulish soldier wearing a Roman lorica hamata

Modern historians believe that mail armor was invented by the Celts. With the idea for this form of mail possibly coming to Rome during conflicts with the Celts in the 3rd century BC, lorica hamata was used by both legionary and auxilia troops. The first documented use occurred during the Roman conquest of Hispania. There were several versions of this type of armor, specialized for different military duties such as skirmishers, cavalry, and spearmen. Over its lifetime, the lorica hamata remained in constant use by legionaries and it was the preferred armor of centurions, who favored its greater coverage and lower maintenance. Constant friction kept the rings of the lorica hamata free of rust. Only the richest soldiers could afford to wear it. During the early empire depictions of emperors wearing either the lorica hamata or lorica squamata were very rare. However, during the later empire such depictions were more common. During the 1st century AD it was starting to be supplemented by lorica segmentata, but had been reintroduced as sole standard-issue armor by the 4th century. Despite that, the lorica hamata was still common among the legionary soldiers in the 2nd century.

== Forging ==
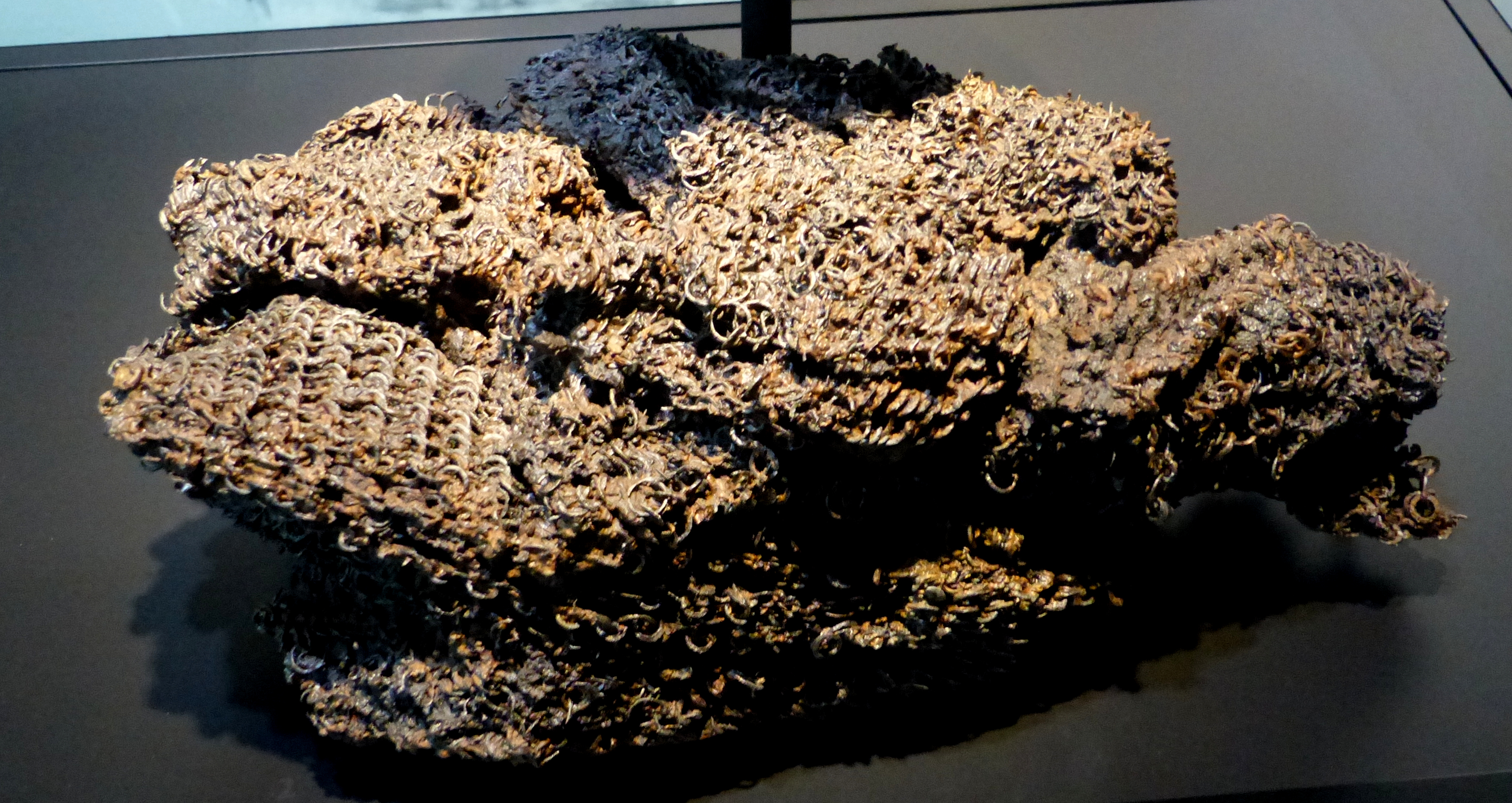
Lorica hamata at Limesmuseum Aalen, Baden-Württemberg, Germany

The lorica hamata was mostly manufactured out of bronze or iron. The armor was made from alternating rows of rings and rows of riveted rings. The rings would be made from punching holes in iron sheets. The riveted rings would be made from wires with their ends butted together. This produced very flexible, and strong armor. Each ring had an inside diameter of about 5 mm (0.20 in), and an outside diameter of about 7 mm (0.28 in). There were 35,000 to 40,000 rings in the armor. It was cut like a Greek cuirass made of linen. Leather pteruges were underneath the armor. The lorica hamata contained flaps that ran from about mid-back to the front of the torso. These flaps were connected to the main armor through hooks made of either brass or iron that connected to studs riveted through the ends of the flaps.

During the Republican period of Rome, the armor was also sleeveless. Despite the lack of sleeves, the lorica hamata still protected the wearers‘ shoulders through shoulder pieces. During the Imperial period of Roman history, the armor would gain sleeves. By the 3rd century, those sleeves would extend to the elbows of the soldier wearing it. During the reign of Augustus the previously mentioned shoulder pieces would extend to the upper arm. The shoulder pieces were attached to the regular armor through bronze hooks. Those hooks would be stylized as snakes and horns. The practice of stylizing the armor probably originated from the Celts. By the end of the first century the practice of stylizing the hooks fell out of favor. A standard lorica hamata weighed around 11 kg (24 lb), though this would vary depending on the design and the materials used. Despite the fact that the armor was difficult to forge, with good maintenance, the armor could be used for several decades. The comfort of the armor did come at the cost of some protection, and the weight placed a concentrated strain on the wearer's shoulders. However, the armor still protected its wearers well. The estimated production time was two months, even with continual slave labor at the state-run armories.

== See also ==
- Lorica plumata
- Lorica segmentata
- Lorica squamata
- Roman military personal equipment
