= Lorica squamata =

Roman armour

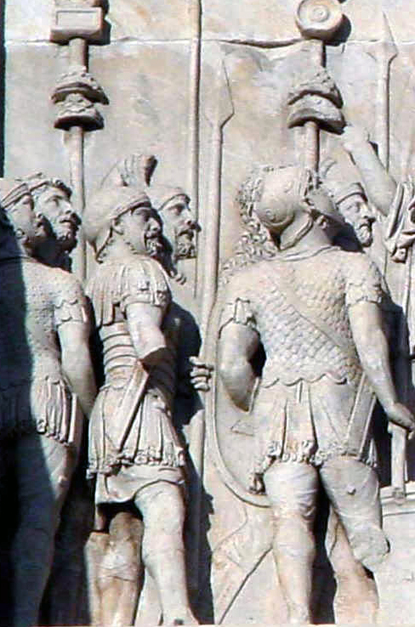
Relief on the Arch of Constantine depicting soldiers wearing the lorica squamata

The lorica squamata (Latin pronunciation: [loːr̺iːka skʷaːmaːt̪a]) is a type of scale armour used by the ancient Roman military during the Roman Republic and at later periods. It was made from small metal scales sewn to a fabric backing. No examples of an entire lorica squamata have been found, but there have been several archaeological finds of fragments of such shirts and individual scales are quite common finds—even in non-military contexts.

== Use in the Roman army ==
It is typically seen on depictions of signiferes (standard bearers), aeneatores, centurions, cavalry troops, and auxiliary infantry, as well as regular legionaries. On occasion the emperor would even be depicted wearing the lorica squamata. During the Dacian Wars Trajan had to re-equip his soldiers wearing lorica segmentata with other forms of armor such as the lorica hamata and lorica squamata. It is not known precisely when the Romans adopted the type of armor, but it remained in use for about eight centuries, most prominently in the 1st and 2nd centuries AD.

== Forging ==
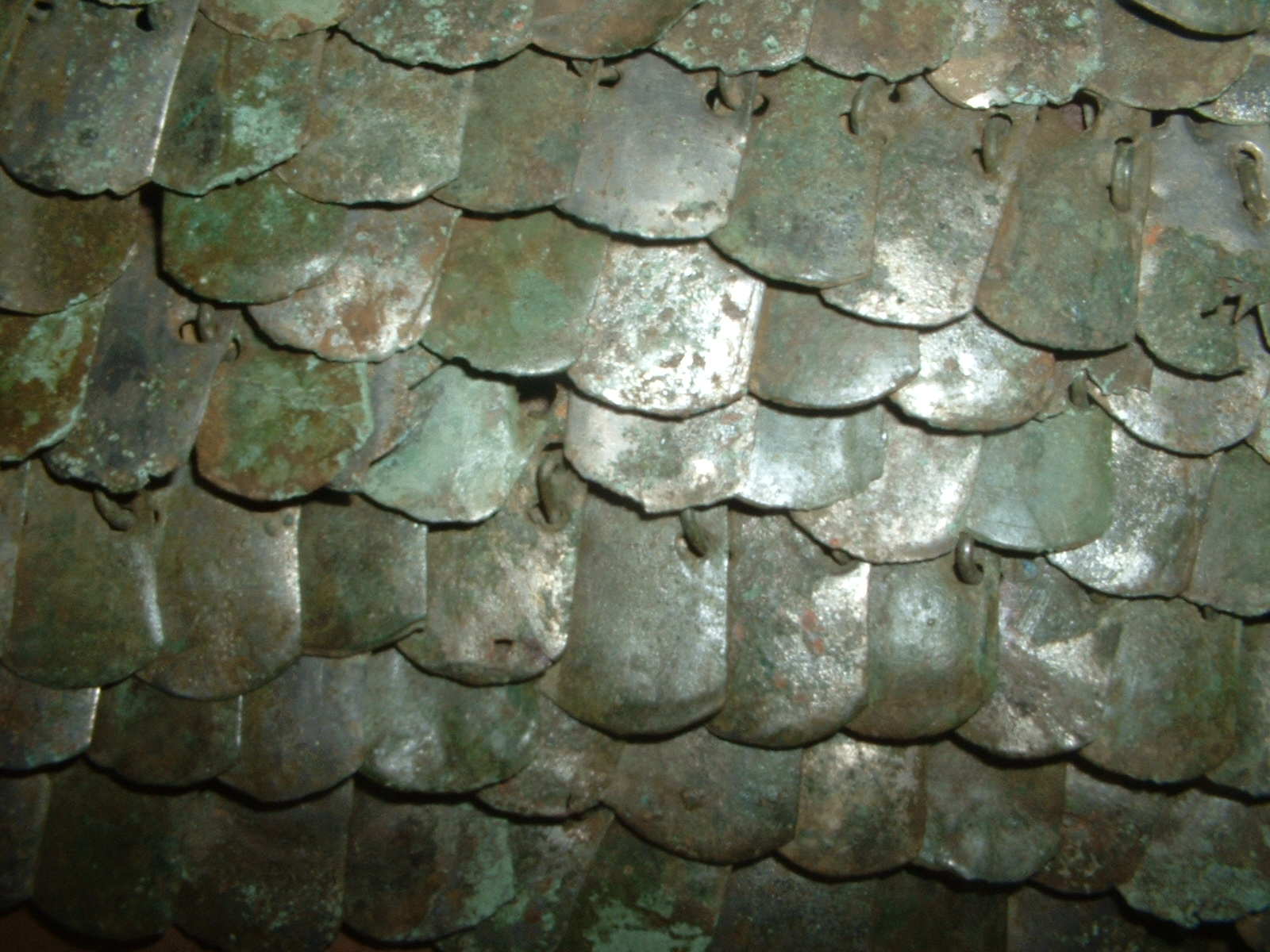
Detail of a fragment. Each plate has six holes and the scales are linked in rows. Only the "lower most" holes are visible on most scales, while a few show the pair above and the ring fastener passing through them.

The individual scales, called squamae were very small scales made of either iron or brass. Occasionally, they would be tinned in white metal. Each scale had a 90° fold and a medial rib. The scales were wired or laced together in horizontal rows that were then laced or sewn to the backing. Rarely, the backing might be mail (lorica hamata) providing two layers of defense at the cost of greater weight and expense. The mail under the scales was made of interlocking rings arranged in rows—rings closed by riveting, or a combination of these with solid rings made by punching holes in metal sheets. It is possible that the shirt could be opened either at the back or down one side so that it was easier to put on, the opening being closed by ties. Much has been written about scale armour's supposed vulnerability to an upward thrust, but this may be exaggerated. Since the scales overlapped in every direction, the multiple layers gave good protection.

A similar type of armour, in which the scales are laced to each other and need no backing at all, is known as lamellar armour, while to confuse the matter there is also locking scale in which the scales are wired together without a backing. It can be difficult to tell which type of armour a single scale might have come from, as the Romans did not necessarily have different terms for each type. The typical scale had a vertical pair of holes at each side near the top, plus one or two holes at the top.

== See also ==
- Lorica hamata
- Lorica plumata
- Lorica segmentata
- Lorica musculata
- Roman military personal equipment
- Laminar armour
