= Roman military personal equipment =

Ancient Roman soldier's equipment

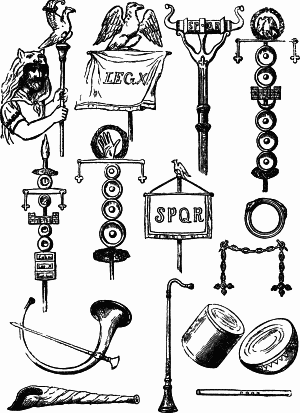
Roman ensigns, standards, trumpets etc.

Roman military personal equipment was produced in large numbers to established patterns, and used in an established manner by the military of ancient Rome. These standard patterns and uses were called the res militaris or disciplina. Its regular practice during the Roman Republic and Roman Empire led to military excellence and victory. The equipment gave the Romans a very distinct advantage over their "barbarian" enemies, especially so in the case of armour. This does not mean that every Roman soldier had better equipment than the richer men among his opponents. Roman equipment was not of a better quality than that used by the majority of Rome's adversaries. Other historians and writers have stated that the Roman army's need for large quantities of "mass produced" equipment after the so-called "Marian Reforms" and subsequent civil wars led to a decline in the quality of Roman equipment compared to the earlier Republican era:

The production of these kinds of helmets of Italic tradition decreased in quality because of the demands of equipping huge armies, especially during civil wars...The bad quality of these helmets is recorded by the sources describing how sometimes they were covered by wicker protections (viminea tegimenta), like those of Pompeius' soldiers during the siege of Dyrrachium in 48 BC, which were seriously damaged by the missiles of Caesar's slingers and archers.

It would appear that armour quality suffered at times when mass production methods were being used to meet the increased demand which was very high (from the Civil and Social Wars, and following the Marian and Augustan reforms) the reduced size cuirasses would also have been quicker and cheaper to produce, which may have been a deciding factor at times of financial crisis, or where large bodies of men were required to be mobilized at short notice, possibly reflected in the poor-quality, mass produced iron helmets of Imperial Italic type C, as found, for example, in the River Po at Cremona, associated with the Civil Wars of AD 69 AD; Russell Robinson, 1975, 67

Up until then, the quality of helmets had been fairly consistent and the bowls well decorated and finished. However, after the Marian Reforms, with their resultant influx of the poorest citizens into the army, there must inevitably have been a massive demand for cheaper equipment, a situation which can only have been exacerbated by the Civil Wars...

Initially, they used weapons based on Greek and Etruscan models. On encountering the Celts, they based new varieties on Celtic equipment. To defeat the Carthaginians, they constructed an entire fleet de novo based on the Carthaginian model. Once a weapon was adopted, it became standard. The standard weapons varied somewhat during Rome's long history, but the equipment and its use were never individual.

== Weapons of a Roman legionary ==
=== Pugio ===
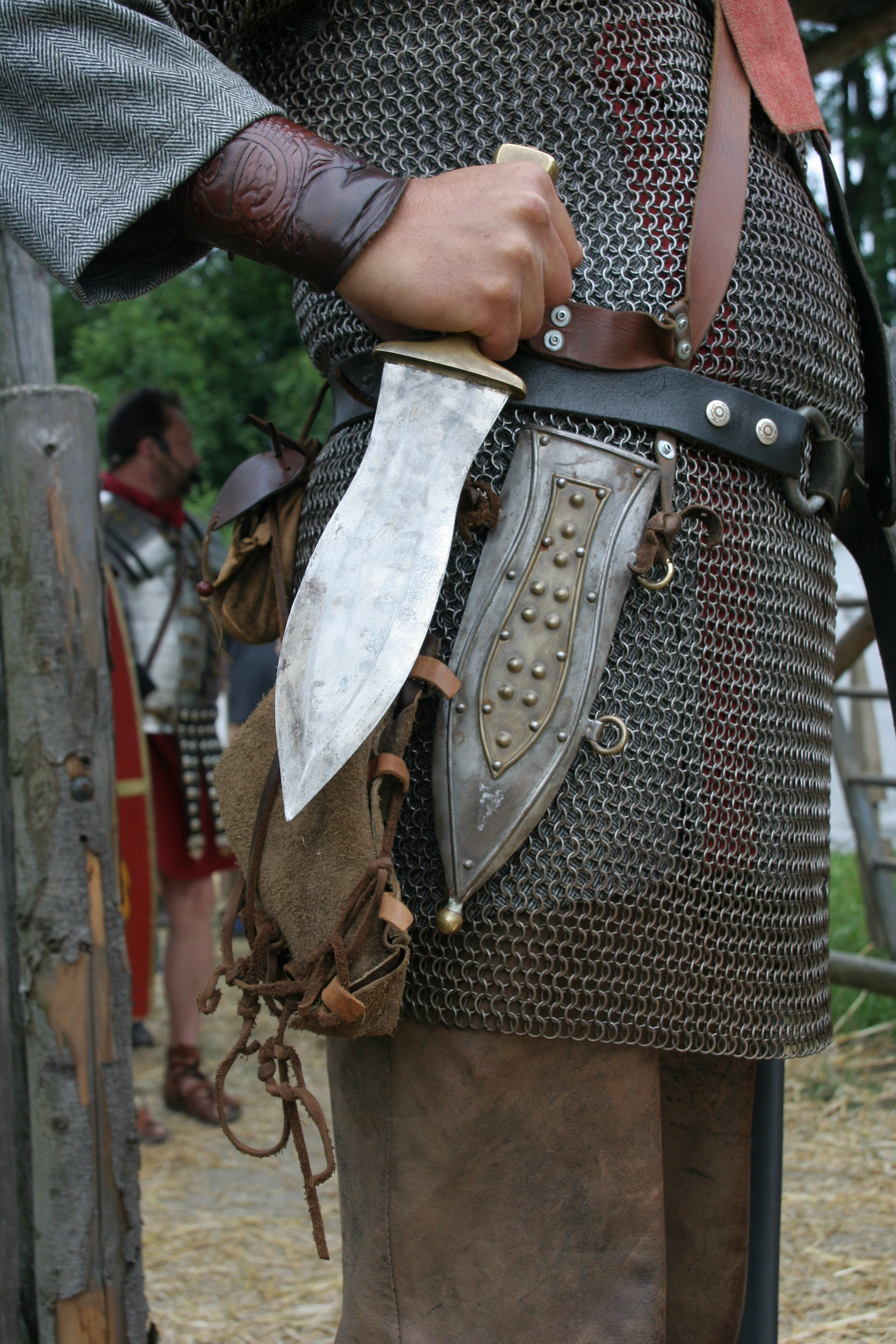
Reconstruction of a pugio: a Roman soldier from a northern province

A pugio is a dagger that was used by Roman soldiers, likely as a sidearm. Like other items of legionary equipment, the dagger underwent some changes during the 1st century. Generally, it had a large, leaf-shaped blade 18 to 28 cm long and 5 cm or more in width. A raised midrib ran the length of each side, either simply standing out from the face or defined by grooves on either side. It was changed by making the blade a little thinner, about 3 mm, and the handle was also made out of metal. The tang was wide and flat initially, and the grip was riveted through it, as well as through the shoulders of the blade.

Around 50 AD, a rod tang was introduced, and the hilt was no longer riveted through the shoulders of the blade. This in itself caused no great change to the pugio's appearance, but some of these later blades were narrower (under 3.5 cm wide), had little or no waisting, and had reduced or vestigial midribs.

Throughout the period, the outline of the hilt remained approximately the same. It was made with two layers of horn, wood or bone sandwiching the tang, each overlaid with a thin metal plate. Often the hilt was decorated with inlaid silver. The hilt was 10–12 cm long overall and the grip was quite narrow; which produced a very secure grip. An expansion or lump in the middle of the handle made the user's grip even more secure.

=== Gladius ===
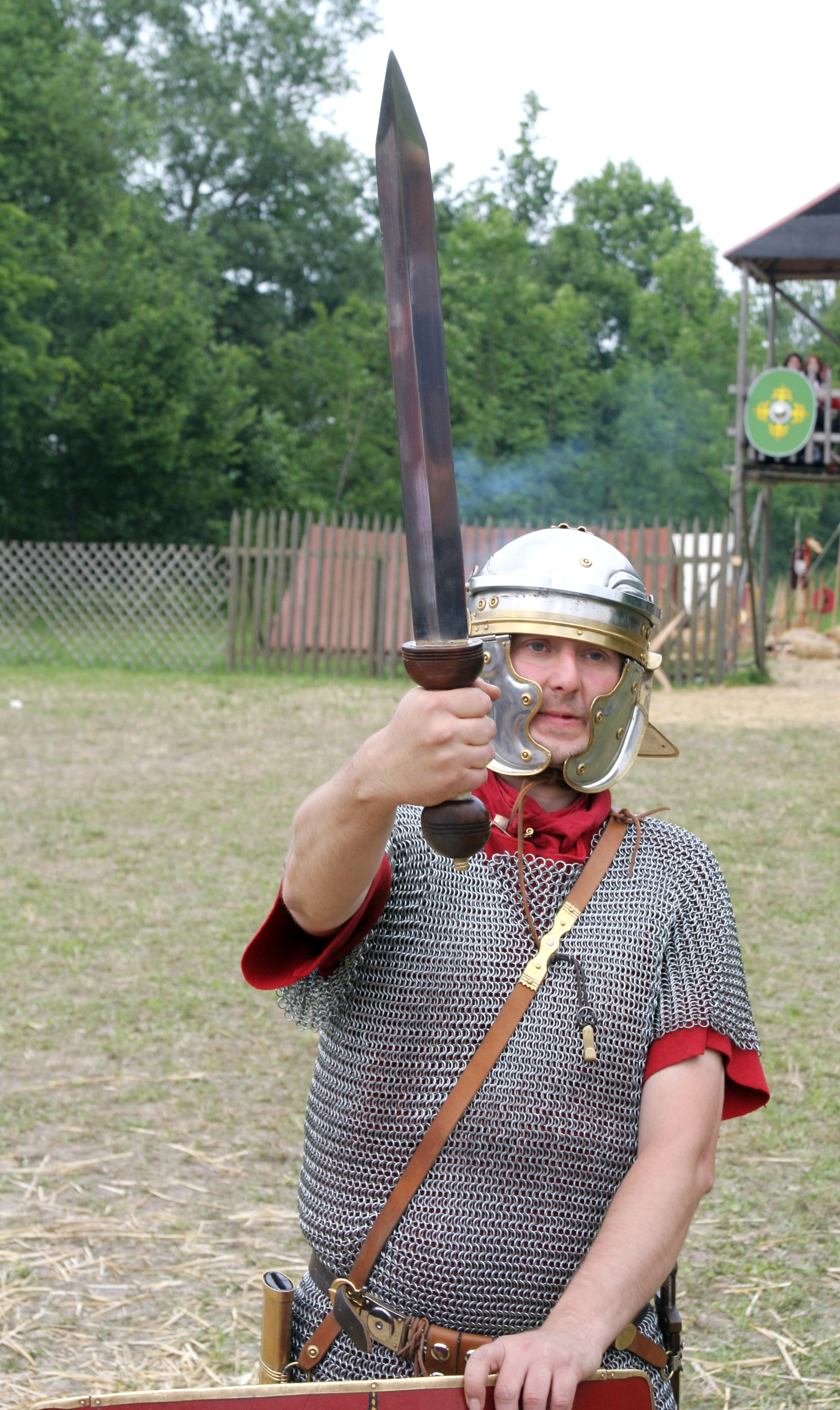
Re-enactor with Pompeii-type gladius

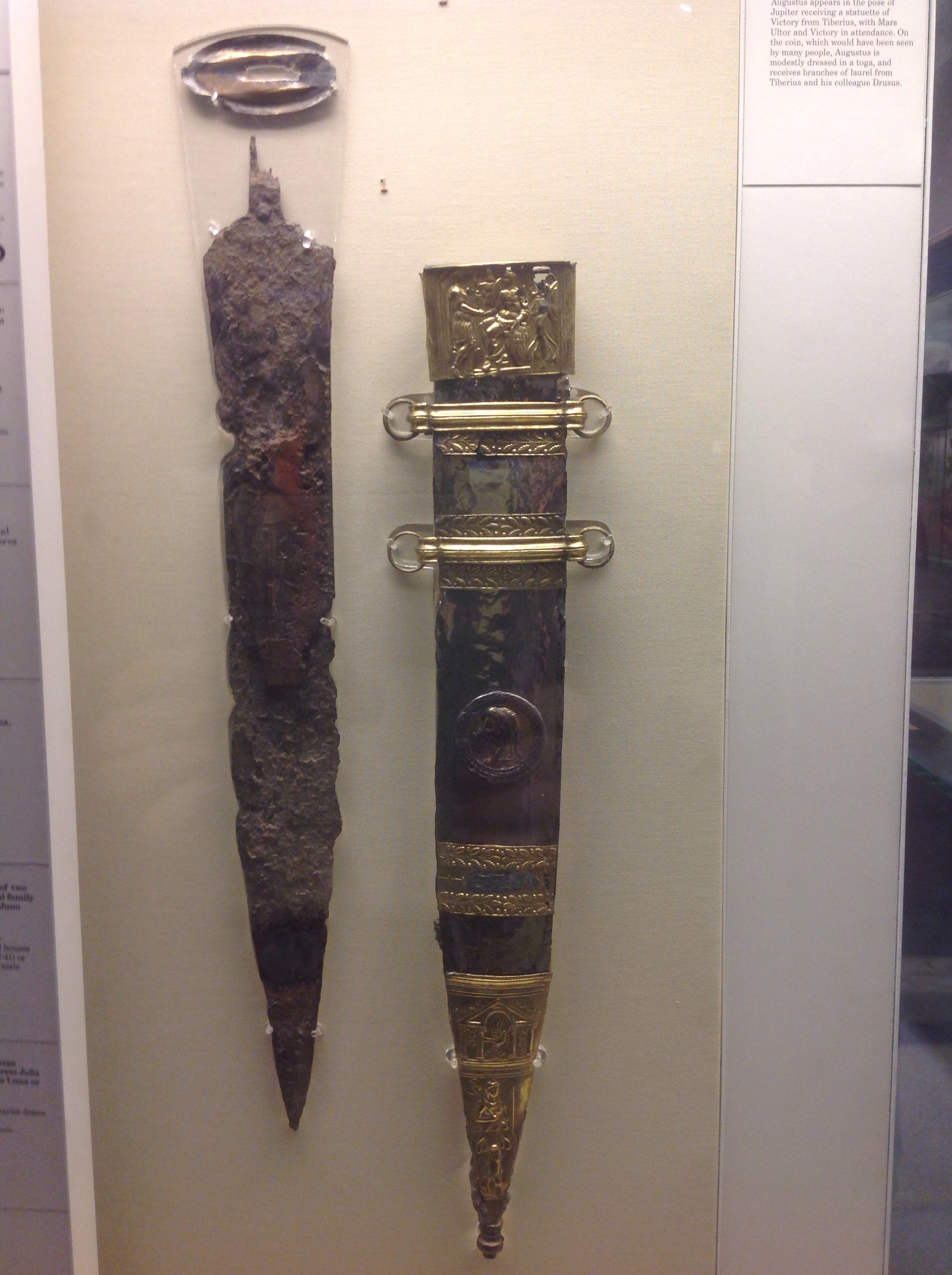
The Mainz Gladius on display at the British Museum, London

Gladius is the general Latin word for 'sword'. In the Roman Republic, the term gladius Hispaniensis (Spanish sword) referred (and still refers) specifically to the short sword, 60 cm (24 inches) long, used by Roman legionaries from the 3rd century BC. It is considered to be the primary weapon used by soldiers in war. Several different better-known designs followed; among collectors and historical reenactors, the two primary kinds of swords are known as the Mainz gladius, and the Pompeii gladius which follows the Mainz type, which had itself followed the Hispaniensis (these names refer to where or how the canonical example was found). More recent archaeological finds have confirmed the appearance of the earlier version, the gladius Hispaniensis. The legionaries wore their gladii on their right hips. In order to craft a sword with the strength and flexibility of the gladius, blacksmiths used harder steels on the outer layers of the sword while using softer steels in the centre of the blade.

=== Spatha ===
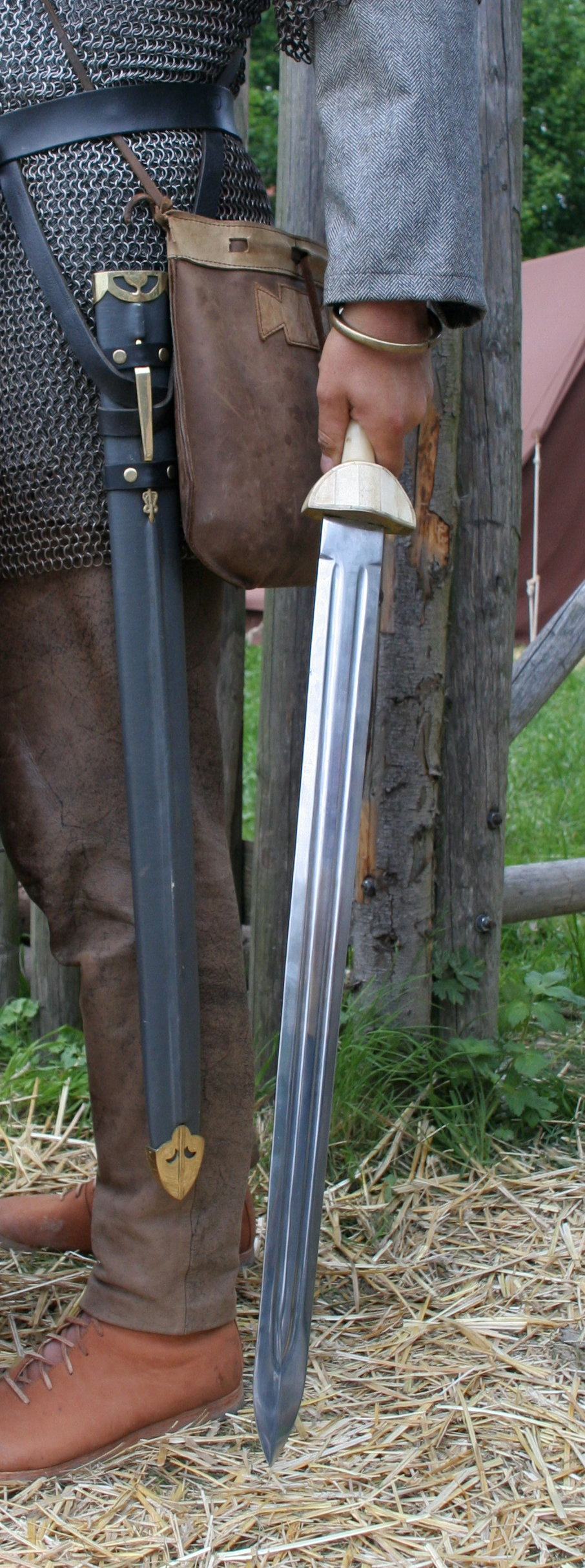
Roman era reenactor holding a replica late Roman spatha

A spatha could be any sword (in late Latin), but most often one of the longer swords characteristic of the middle and late Roman Empire. In the 1st century, Roman cavalry started using these longer swords, and in the late 2nd or early 3rd century, Roman infantry also switched to longer swords, as well as mostly changing from carrying javelins to carrying spears.

Shorter weapons (short swords and possibly sometimes daggers) were known as semispathae or half-swords. A large 3rd-century hoard from Künzing included one triangular-bladed short sword and several narrow-bladed short swords (with 23–39 cm blades). Bishop and Coulston suggest that some or all were made from broken spathae.

=== Spears and javelins (hastae) ===
==== Hasta ====
Hasta is a Latin word meaning a thrusting spear. Hastae were carried by early Roman legionaries (camillan); in particular, they were carried by and gave their name to those Roman soldiers known as hastati. However, during republican times, the hastati were re-armed with pila and gladii, and only the triarii still used hastae.

A hasta was about 1.8 metres (six feet) in length. The shaft was generally made from ash while the head was usually of iron, although early republican hastae also had tips made of bronze.

==== Javelin ====
Although Romans often used the word pila to refer to all thrown javelins, the term pilum also means specifically the heavy Roman throwing javelin of the legions. Lighter, shorter javelins existed, such as those used by the velites and the early legions, called verutum. Other types of javelins were adopted by the late Roman army, such as the lancea and the spiculum, which were heavily influenced by the weapons of Italic warriors.

==== Pilum ====
The pilum (plural pila) was a heavy javelin commonly used by the Roman army in ancient times. It was generally somewhat less than two metres (6 ft 7 in) long overall, consisting of a wooden shaft from which projected an iron shank about 7 mm (0.28 inches) in diameter and 60 cm (23.6 in) long with a pyramidal head. The iron shank was socketed or, more usually, widened to a flat tang. A pilum usually weighed between two and four kilograms (4.4 and 8.8 lb), with the versions produced during the empire era being somewhat lighter.

Pila were designed to penetrate both shield and armour, wounding the wearer; but, if they simply stuck in a shield, they could not easily be removed. Some believed that the iron shank would bend upon impact, weighing down the enemy's shield and also preventing the pilum from being immediately re-used. Some versions of the shaft may have fallen off on impact, leaving the enemy with a bent shank in their shield. However, recent evidence suggests that many types of pilum did not bend at all, but reduced the effectiveness of enemy shields by simply getting stuck due to the shape of its larger head and thin shank. In fact, there were many cases where the whole shank was hardened, making the pilum more suitable as a close quarters melee weapon, while also rendering it usable by enemy soldiers. Newer work by M. C. Bishop states that the pila are "unlikely to bend under their own weight when thrown and striking a target or ground" - rather, it is human intervention [e.g., improper removal of a pilum stuck in a target] that is responsible in some way, and that Caesar's writings should be interpreted as the pilum bent when soldiers tried to remove them. A sturdy pilum that does not bend upon impact would be in line with the numerous historical Roman writings that state the pilum was often used as a weapon in melee combat: For example, in "The Gallic Wars" Caesar writes that at Alesia his troops used the pila as spears or pikes. In the "Life of Pompey" and "Life of Antony", Plutarch describes Caesar's men at Pharsalus jabbing upwards at the faces of Pompey's cavalry with their javelins and Marc Antony's men stabbing at Parthian cavalry with theirs. In Arrian in Array against the Alans, Arrian writes that the first four ranks of the formation should use their pila like spearmen, while the rest should use them like javelins.

=== Projectile weapons ===
==== Bow ====
The sagittarius was armed with a composite bow (arcus), shooting an arrow (sagitta), made of horn, wood, and sinew held together with hide glue. However, Vegetius recommended training recruits "arcubus ligneis", with wooden bows. The reinforcing laths for the composite bows were found throughout the empire, even in the western provinces where wooden bows were traditional.

==== Crossbow ====
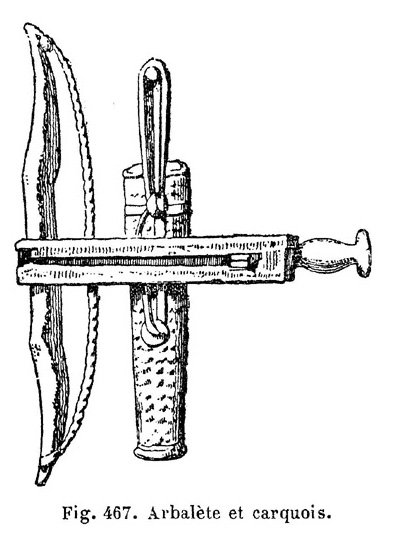
Roman crossbow

The cheiroballistra, also known as the manuballista, was a crossbow that was occasionally used by the Romans. The ancient world knew a variety of mechanical hand-held weapons similar to the later medieval crossbow. The exact terminology is a subject of continuing scholarly debate. Roman authors like Vegetius (fl. 4th century) note repeatedly the use of arrow shooting weapons such as arcuballista and manuballista respectively cheiroballista. While most scholars agree that one or more of these terms refer to handheld mechanical weapons, there is disagreement whether these were flexion bows or torsion powered like the recent Xanten find.

The Roman commander Arrian records in his Tactica Roman cavalry training for shooting some mechanical handheld weapon from horseback. Sculptural reliefs from Roman Gaul depict the use of crossbows in hunting scenes. These are remarkably similar to the later medieval crossbow.

==== Plumbatae ====
Late infantrymen often carried a half-dozen lead-weighted throwing-darts called plumbatae (from plumbum, meaning "lead"), with an effective range of c. 30 m, well beyond that of a javelin. The darts were carried clipped to the back of the shield.

== Entrenching tools ==
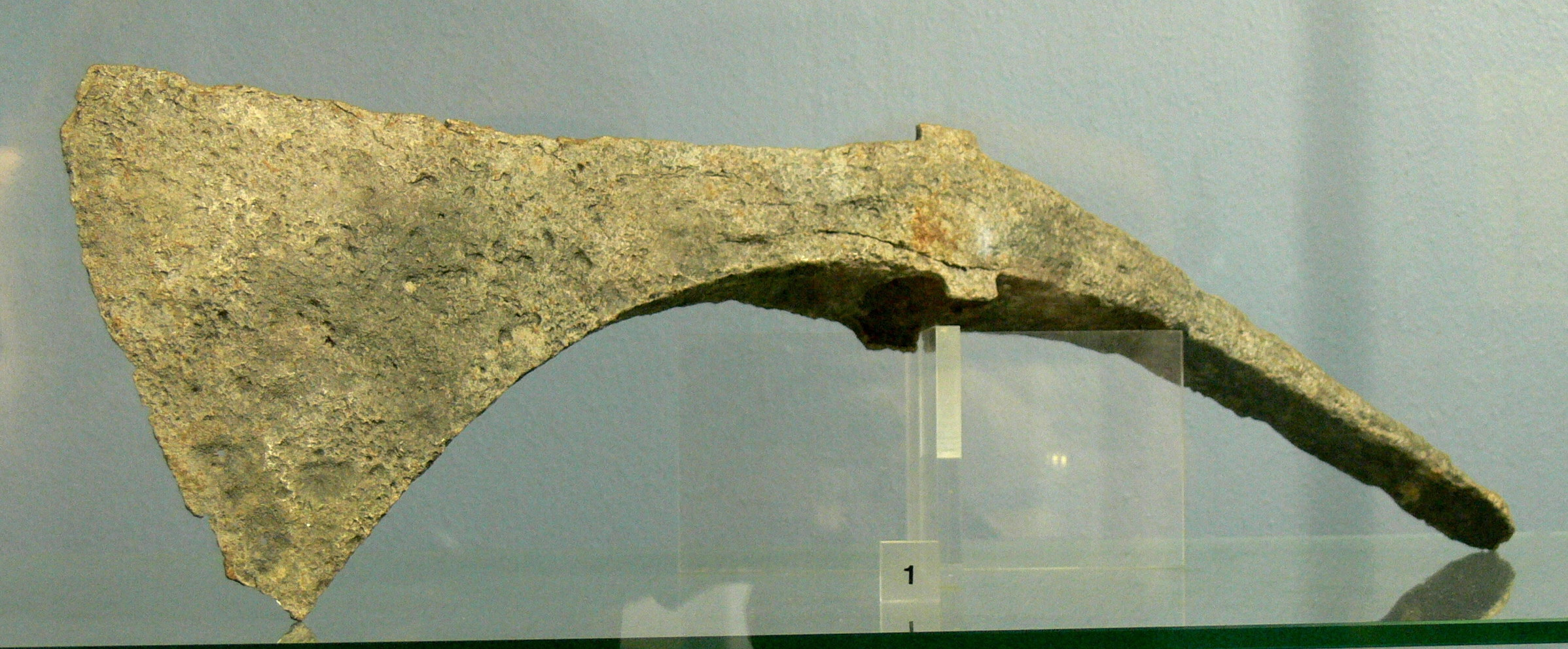
3- to 4th-century Roman pickaxe, copper alloy

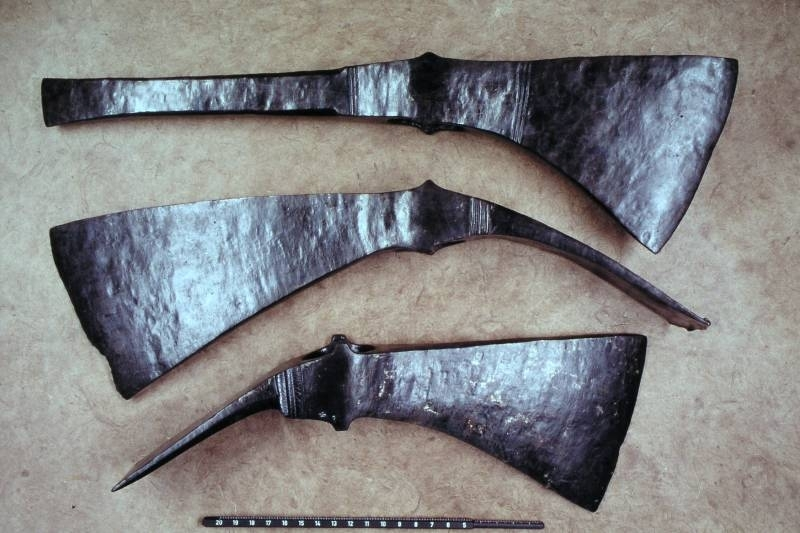
The unhafted iron heads of three early Roman tools. Top, an axe with a straight spike ending in a vertical chisel-like point, and bottom, two cutter mattocks

Ancient writers, including Julius Caesar, documented the use of spades and other digging implements as important tools of war. A Roman legion when on the march would dig a ditch and rampart around their camps every night where established camps were not available. They were also useful as weapons.

=== Dolabra ===
The dolabra was a pickaxe used as an entrenching tool.

=== Ligo ===
The ligo was a pick-mattock or draw hoe, with a blade perpendicular to the handle.

A mattock /ˈmætək/ is a hand tool used for digging, prying, and chopping. Similar to the pickaxe, it has a long handle and a stout head which combines either a vertical axe blade with a horizontal adze (cutter mattock), or a pick and an adze (pick mattock). A cutter mattock is similar to a Pulaski used in fighting fires. It is also commonly known in North America as a "grub axe".

=== Falx ===
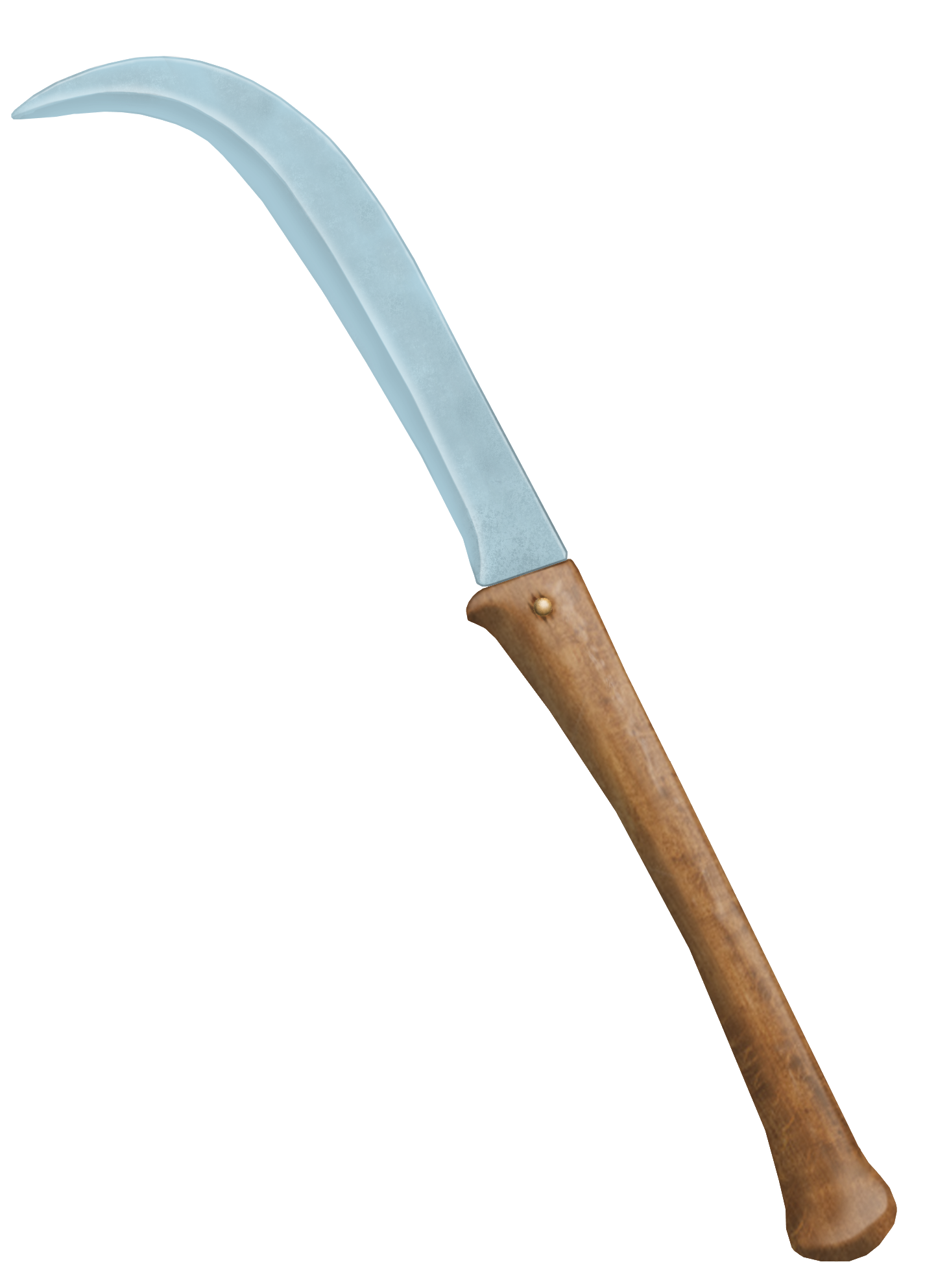
Falx as used by the Dacians as a weapon against the Romans, drawing based on the Trajan Adamclisi Monument

The falx was a curved blade that was sharp on the inside edge such as a sickle or a scythe. It was used to clear overgrowth.

== Torso armour ==
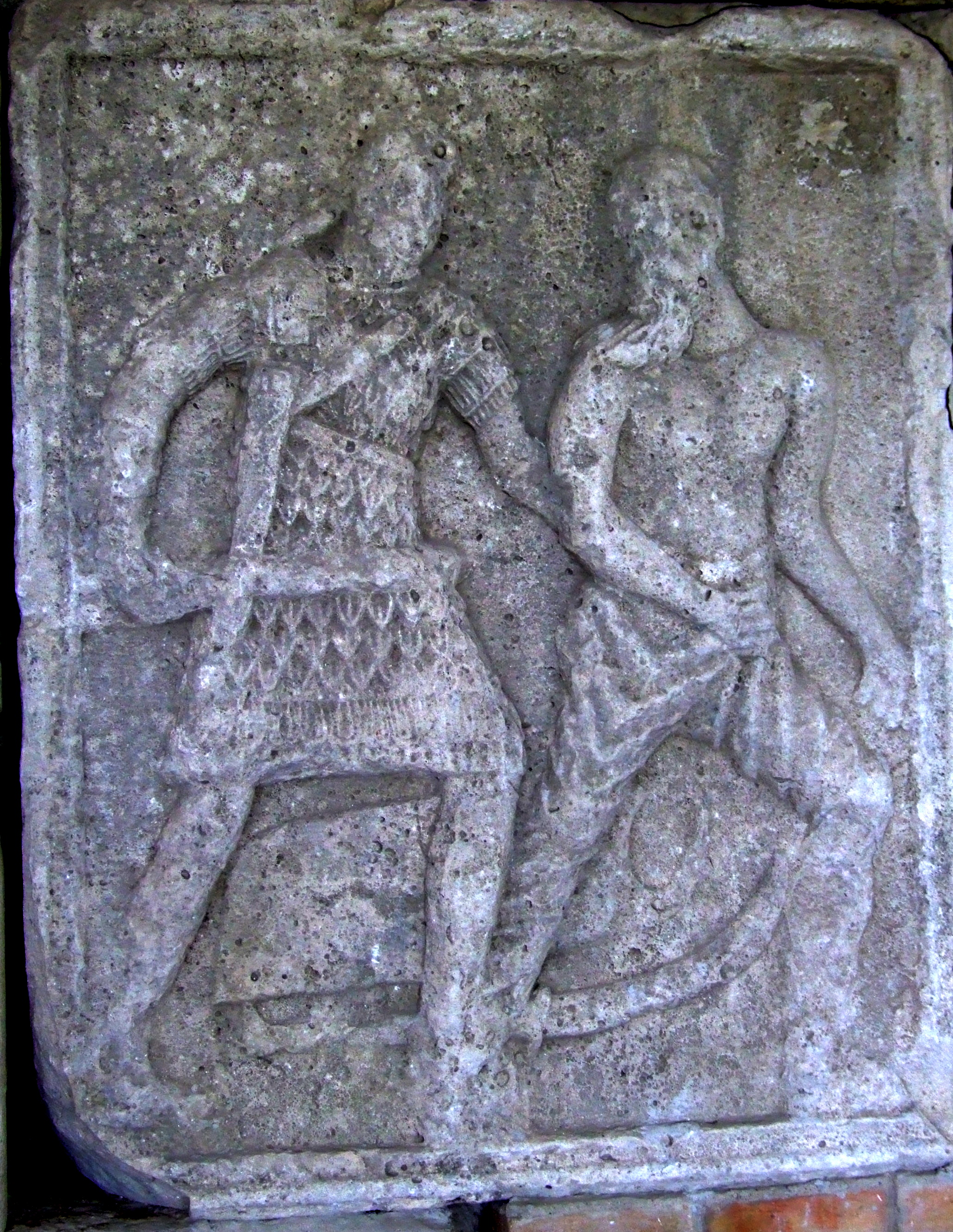
Scale armour

Metal torso armour was always heavy and expensive, and it was not always available; not all troops wore it. In the early republic few men wore more than a small breastplate, and light cavalry or light infantry wore little or no armour at any time.

Legionary soldiers of the 1st and 2nd centuries used a variety of armour types. Some wore mail shirts, while others wore scale armour or lorica segmentata or laminated-strip cuirass. This last type was a complex piece of armour which in certain circumstances provided superior protection to the other types of Roman armour, mail armour (lorica hamata) and scale armour (lorica squamata). The testing of modern replicas has demonstrated that this kind of armour was impenetrable to most direct hits and missile strikes. It was, however, uncomfortable without padding: re-enactors have confirmed that wearing a padded undergarment known as a subarmalis relieves the wearer from bruising both from prolonged wear and from shock produced by weapon blows against the armour. It was also expensive to produce and difficult to maintain. In the 3rd century, the segmentata appears to have been dropped and troops are depicted wearing mail armour (mainly) or scale, the standard armour of the 2nd-century auxilia. The artistic record shows that most late soldiers wore metal armour, despite Vegetius's statement to the contrary. For example, illustrations in the Notitia show that the army's fabricae (arms factories) were producing mail armour at the end of the 4th century. Actual examples of both scale armour and quite large sections of mail have been recovered, at Trier and Weiler-La-Tour respectively, within 4th-century contexts. Officers generally seem to have worn bronze or iron cuirasses, as in the days of the principate, together with traditional pteruges.

=== Lorica segmentata ===
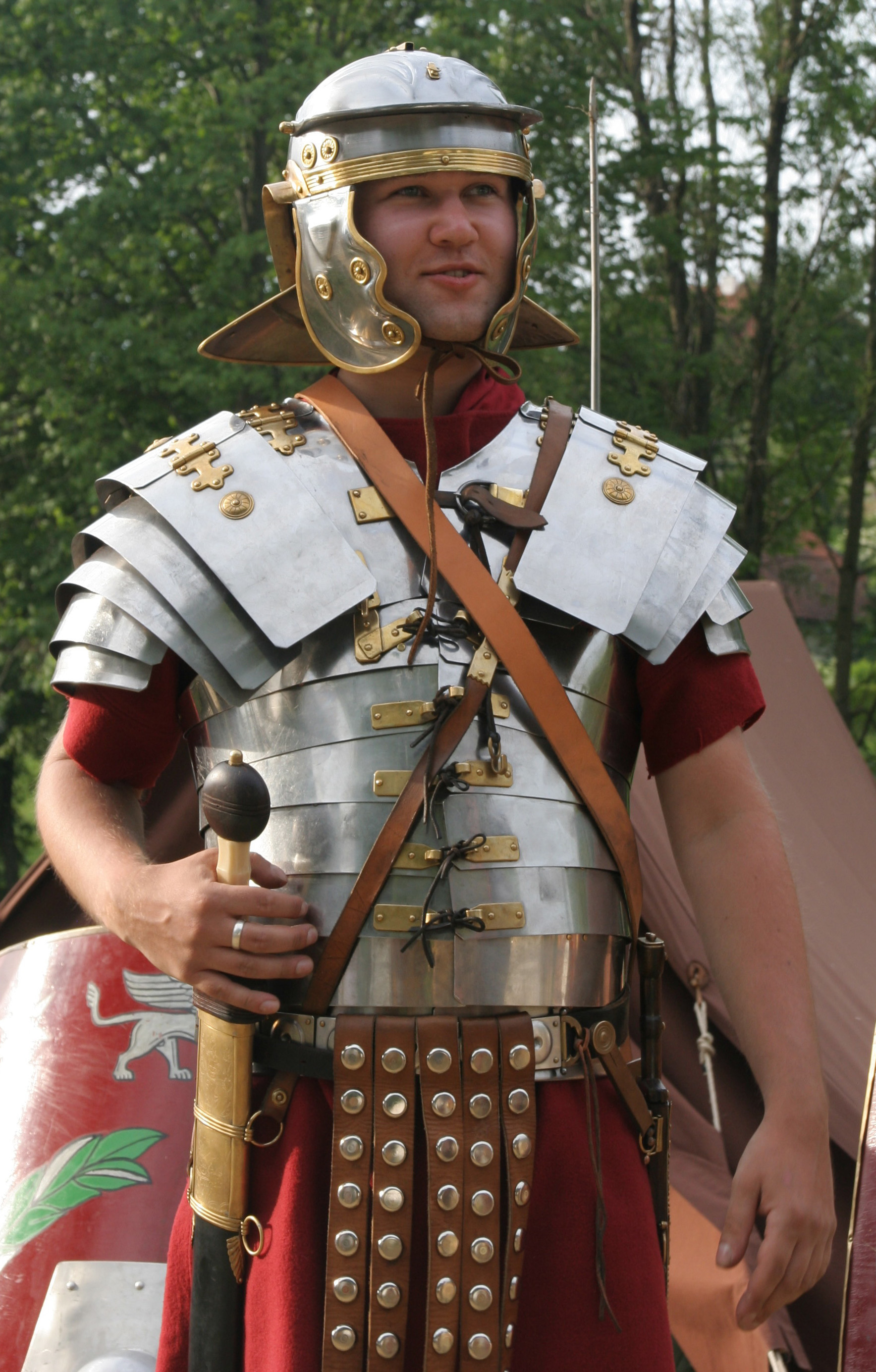
A reenactor dressed as a Roman soldier in lorica segmentata

Lorica segmentata was a type of body armour primarily used in the early Roman Empire, but the Latin name was first used in the 16th century (the ancient form is unknown). The armour itself consisted of broad ferrous strips ('girth hoops') fastened to internal leather straps. The strips were arranged horizontally on the body, overlapping downwards, and they surrounded the torso in two halves, being fastened at the front and back by means of brass hooks, which were joined by leather laces. The upper body and shoulders were protected by additional strips ('shoulder guards') and breast- and backplates. The form of the armour allowed it to be stored very compactly, since it was possible to separate it into four sections. During the time of its use, it was modified several times, the currently recognised types being the Kalkriese (c. 20 BC to 50), Corbridge (c. 40 to 120), and Newstead (c. 120 to possibly the early 4th century) types. There is also a little-known fourth type, known only from a statue found at Alba Julia in Romania, where there appears to have been a hybrid form, the shoulders being protected by scale armour and the torso hoops being fewer in number and deeper.

The earliest evidence of the lorica segmentata being worn is around 9 BC (Dangstetten), and the armour was evidently quite common in service until the 2nd century AD, judging from the number of finds throughout this period (over 100 sites are known, many of them in Britain). However, even during the 2nd century AD, the segmentata never replaced the lorica hamata—thus the hamata mail was still standard issue for both heavy infantry and auxiliaries alike. The last recorded use of this armour seems to have been for the last quarter of the 3rd century AD (Leon, Spain).

There are two opinions as to who used this form of armour. One is that only legionaries (heavy infantry of the Roman legions) and praetorians were issued lorica segmentata. Auxiliary forces would more commonly wear the lorica hamata, or lorica squamata. The second viewpoint is that both legionaries and auxiliary soldiers used the segmentata armour and this latter view is supported, to some degree, by archaeological findings. The lorica segmentata offered greater protection than the lorica hamata for about half of the weight, but was also more difficult to produce and repair. The expenses attributed to the segmentata may account for the reversion to ring-mail after the 3rd to 4th century. Alternatively, all forms of armour may have fallen into disuse as the need for heavy infantry waned in favour of the speed of mounted troops.

=== Lorica hamata ===
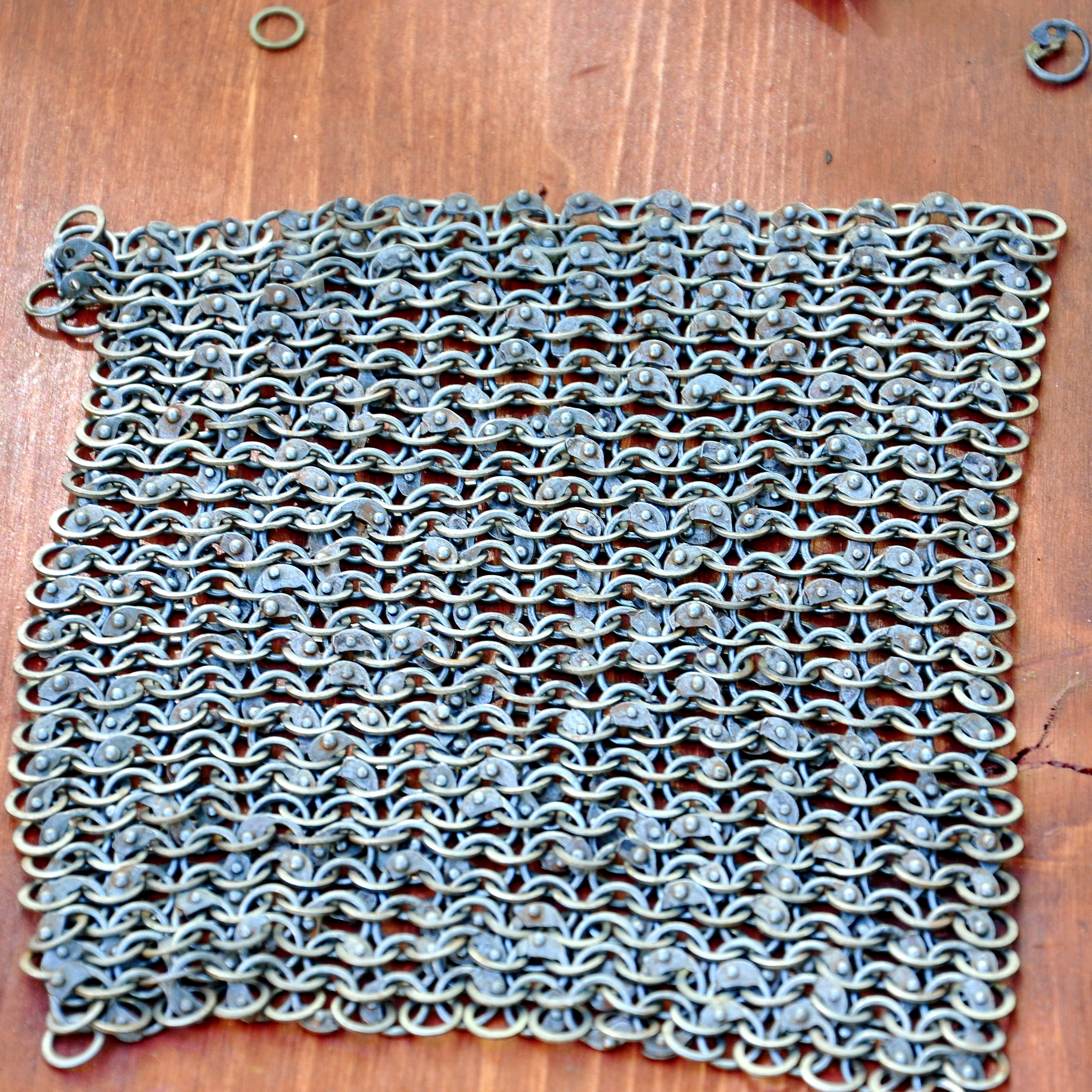
Detail of mail (replica) with 4-in-1 scheme, typical of Roman hamatas, and alternation of rows of solid rings with rows of riveted rings

Lorica hamata was a type of mail armour used during the Roman Republic continuing throughout the Roman Empire as a standard-issue armour for the primary heavy infantry legionaries and secondary troops (auxilia). They were mostly manufactured out of iron, though sometimes bronze was used instead. The rings were linked together, alternating closed washer-like rings with riveted rings. This produced a very flexible, reliable and strong armour. Each ring had an inside diameter of between 5 and 7 mm, and an outside diameter of 7 to 9 mm. The shoulders of the lorica hamata had flaps that were similar to those of the Greek linothorax; they ran from about mid-back to the front of the torso, and were connected by brass or iron hooks which connected to studs riveted through the ends of the flaps. Several thousand rings would have gone into one lorica hamata.

Although labour-intensive to manufacture, it is thought that, with good maintenance, they could be continually used for several decades. Its utility was such that the later appearance of the famous lorica segmentata—which afforded greater protection for a third of the weight—never led to the disappearance of the ubiquitous mail, and, in fact, the army of the late empire reverted to the lorica hamata once the segmentata had fallen out of fashion.

=== Lorica squamata ===
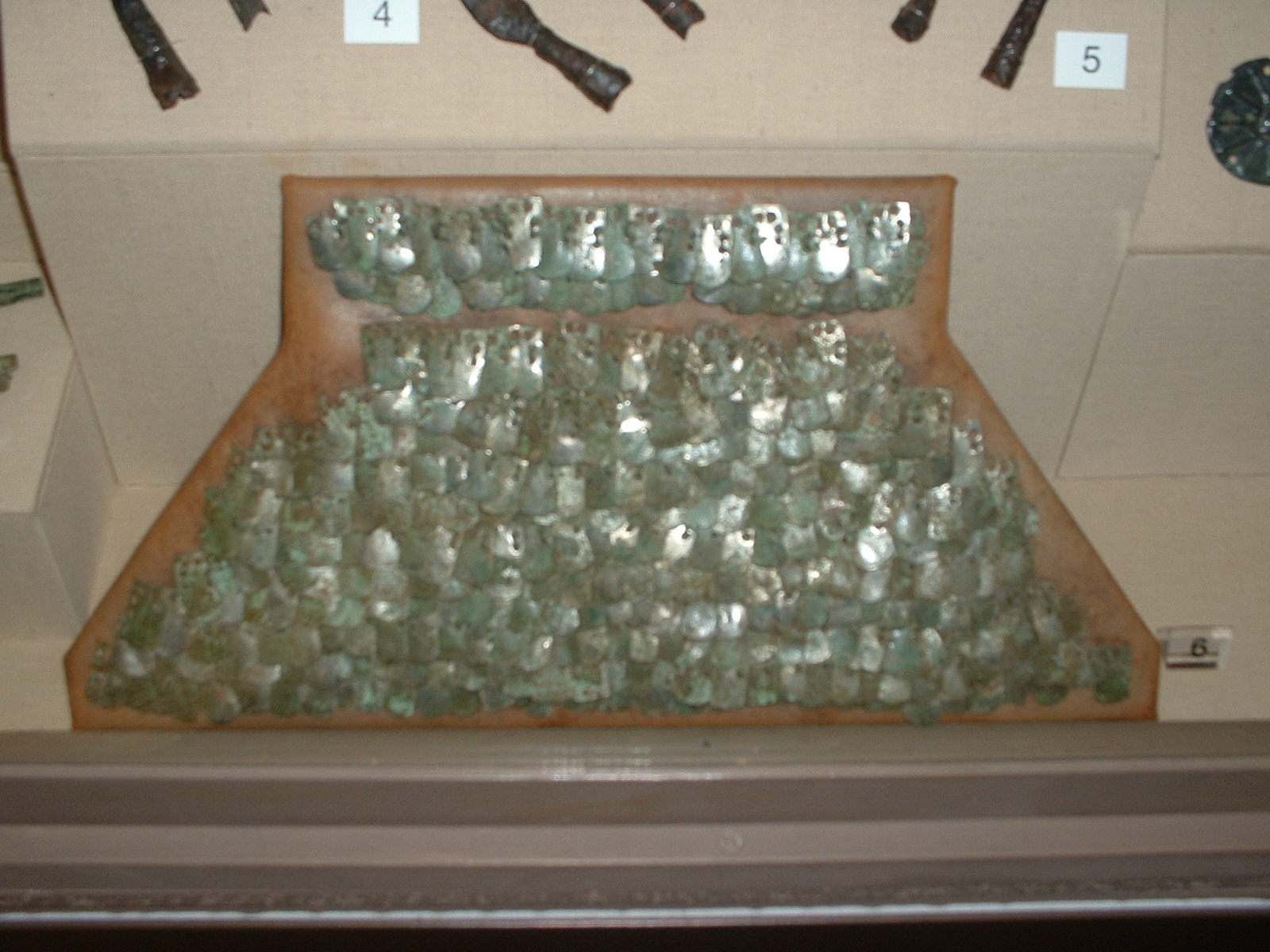
Roman scale armour fragment

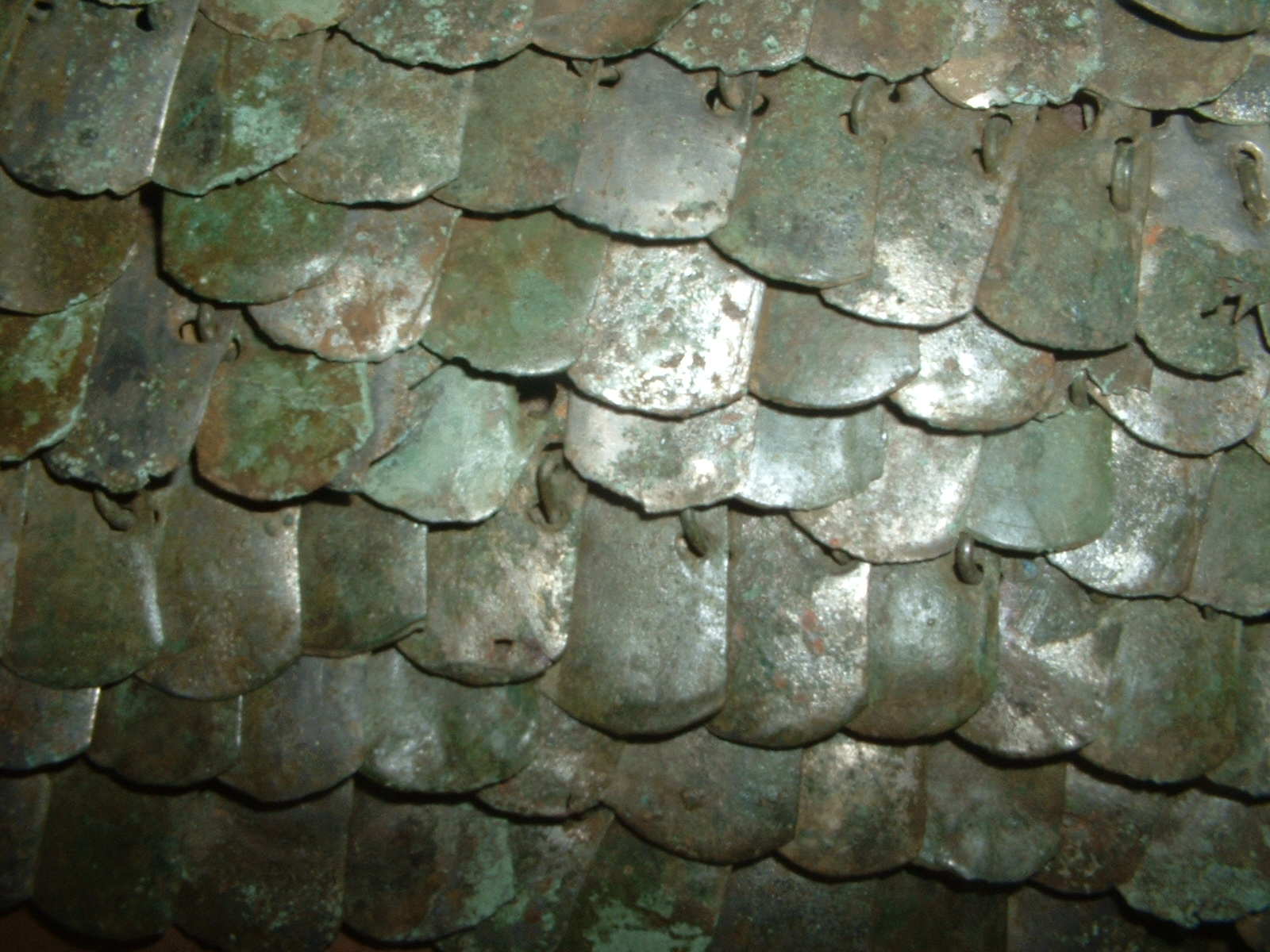
Detail of a fragment. Each plate has six holes and the scales are linked in rows. Only the lower most holes are visible on most scales, while a few show the pair above and the ring fastener passing through them.

Lorica squamata was a type of scale armour used during the Roman Republic and at later periods. It was made from small metal scales sewn to a fabric backing. It is typically seen on depictions of standard bearers, musicians, centurions, cavalry troops, and even auxiliary infantry, but could be worn by regular legionaries as well. A shirt of scale armour was shaped in the same way as a lorica hamata, mid-thigh length with the shoulder doublings or cape.

The individual scales (squamae) were either iron or bronze, or even alternating metals on the same shirt. They could be tinned as well, one surviving fragment showing bronze scales that were alternately tinned and plain. The metal was generally not very thick, 0.5 mm to 0.8 mm (0.02 to 0.032 in) perhaps being a common range. Since the scales overlapped in every direction, however, the multiple layers gave good protection. The size ranged from as small as 6 mm (0.25 in) wide by 1.2 cm tall up to about 5 cm (2 in) wide by 8 cm (3 in) tall, with the most common sizes being roughly 1.25 by 2.5 cm (0.5 by 1 in). Many had rounded bottoms, while others were pointed or had flat bottoms with the corners clipped off at an angle. The scales could be flat, slightly domed, or have a raised midrib or edge. All the scales in a shirt were generally of the same size; however, scales from different shirts varied significantly.

The scales were wired together in horizontal rows that were then laced or sewn to the backing. Therefore, each scale had from four to 12 holes: two or more at each side for wiring to the next in the row, one or two at the top for fastening to the backing, and sometimes one or two at the bottom to secure the scales to the backing or to each other.

It is possible that the shirt could be opened either at the back or down one side so that it was easier to put on, the opening being closed by ties. Much has been written about scale armour's supposed vulnerability to an upward thrust, but this is probably exaggerated.

No examples of an entire lorica squamata have been found, but there have been several archaeological finds of fragments of such shirts and individual scales are quite common finds—even in non-military contexts.

== Shields ==
=== Scutum ===
The scutum (Classical Latin: [ˈskuːt̪ʊ̃]; plural scuta) was a type of shield used among Italic peoples in antiquity, most notably by the army of ancient Rome starting about the fourth century BC.

The Romans adopted it when they switched from the military formation of the hoplite phalanx of the Greeks to the formation with maniples (Latin: manipuli). In the former, the soldiers carried a round shield, which the Romans called a clipeus. In the latter, they used the scutum, which was larger. Originally it was oblong and convex, but by the first century BC it had developed into the rectangular, semi-cylindrical shield that is popularly associated with the scutum in modern times. This was not the only kind the Romans used; Roman shields were of varying types depending on the role of the soldier who carried it. Oval, circular and rectangular shapes were used throughout Roman history.

=== Parma ===
The parma was a circular shield, three Roman feet across. It was smaller than most shields, but was strongly made and regarded as effective protection. Its strength came from its design of gluing multiple layers of wood together while stretching leather across it to eliminate the shields' vulnerability to water. This may have been due to the use of iron in its frame. It had a handle and a shield boss (umbo).

The parma was used in the Roman army of the mid-Republic, by the lowest class division of the army — the velites. The velites' equipment consisted of a parma, javelin, sword and helmet. Later, the parma was replaced by the scutum.

=== Caetra ===
A light shield of steel and leather, the name from Greek (καίτρεα, Hesych.). Used by tribesmen from Hispania, Mauretania, and Britannia.

== Helmets ==
=== Galea ===
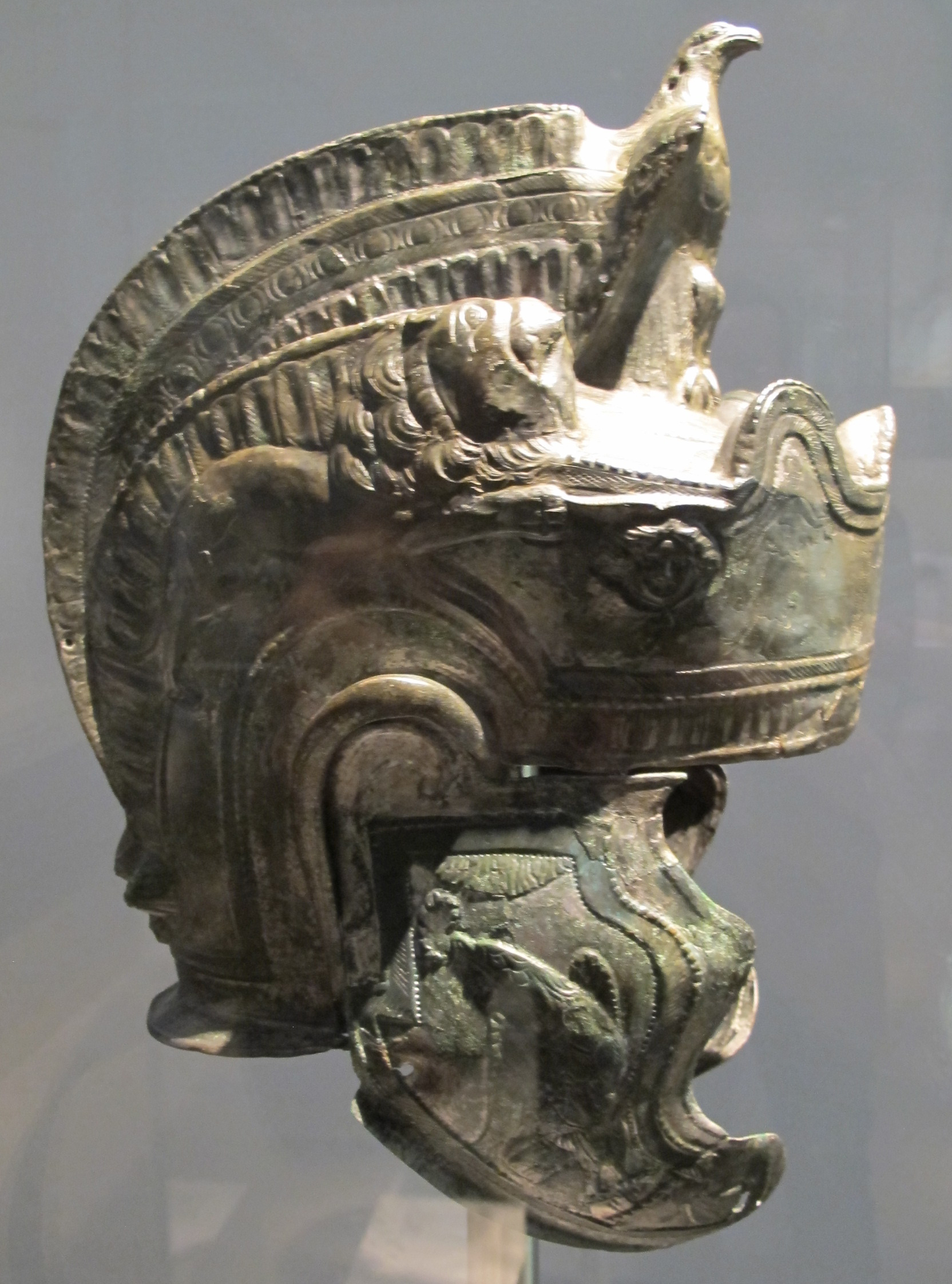
Cavalry parade helmet, latter half of the 2nd century AD, from the German limes.

Roman helmets, galea or cassis, varied greatly in form. One of the earliest types was the Montefortino helmet used by the Republic armies up to the 1st century BC. This was replaced directly by the Coolus helmet, which "raised the neck peak to eye level and set a sturdy frontal peak to the brow of the helmet". The Galea was used from the late 1st century BC to the late 2nd century AD and it drew influence from the Gallic tribes to the north, hence its name. Roman helmets usually featured a bowl protecting the head, an extension at the back with a neck guard, a ridge above the forehead for additional impact protection and decoration, and hinged cheek guards which left the ears exposed for better hearing in the battlefield. They were eventually replaced by the ridge helmet and the Spangenhelm during the late imperial period.

== Limb armour ==
=== Manica ===
From early imperial times to after the fall of the Western Empire, some troops wore segmented armour on one or both arms. The manica was first used by gladiators and it was made either from padded cloth or overlapping metal sheets. Roman legionaries are depicted wearing manicas in engravings of the Dacian Wars.

=== Greave ===
Greaves, sheet metal protecting the legs, were widely used in the early republic, and by some troops in the imperial army. Early Roman legionaries would wear a single greave on the left leg which was more exposed under the shield, as it was fashion in Italic cultures.

== Clothing ==
- Tunic: a basic garment worn under the armour by all soldiers in the republic and early empire. Normally made of wool. Tunics originally consisted simply of a piece of rectangular cloth sewed to an identical piece, with holes for the arms and head left unsewn. Later, it became fashionable for tunics to be produced with sleeves, and worn with braccae.
- Subarmalis: A padded jacket made out of linen or leather, worn underneath armours such as the lorica hamata or lorica segmentata to provide impact protection as well as better weight distribution and comfort.
- Focale: a scarf worn by legionaries to protect the neck from chafing caused by constant contact with the soldier's armour (typically lorica hamata or lorica segmentata) and helmet
- Balteus: a sword belt
- Cingulum militare: a type of decorated belt denoting rank
- Braccae: woollen trousers
- Subligaria: underpants. Their existence was confirmed by one of the Vindolanda tablets.
- Cloak: two types of cloaks were used, the sagum and the paenula. Both were made from wool, which insulated and also contained natural oil to repel water. They were fastened with a fibula. The paenula was hooded in colder climates. Since every common soldier slept in the open, it was important that he have a warm full-length wrap, but necessary that he carry it with him each day regardless of his activities. This was accomplished by a cloak of more than body length, double-folded so that it did not fall beneath the knees when worn. An excellent illustration of this is the statue of Caesar Augustus atop the theater in the Roman city of Orange, in what is now France.
- Caligae: military boots worn by legionaries and auxiliaries throughout the history of the Roman Republic and Empire. The boots were made from leather and laced up the centre of the foot and onto the top of the ankle. Iron hobnails were hammered into the sole for added strength. Similar to the modern cleat.
- Pteruges: leather or fabric strips that formed a skirt or sleeves to protect limbs while maintaining mobility and ventilation. They were usually part of a padding coat worn under the armour, such as the subarmalis. Pteruges could be fitted with small metal studs and plates to provide additional protection.

== Sarcina ==
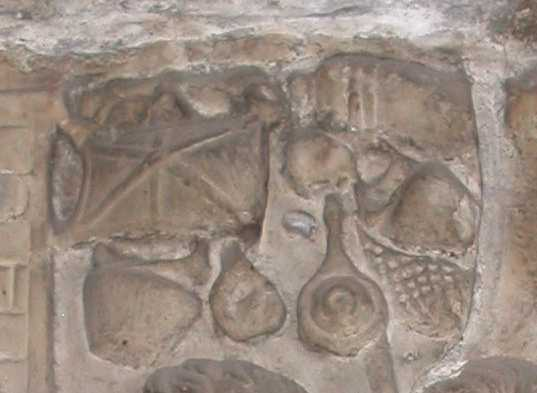
Marching packs of two soldiers illustrated on Trajan's Column showing loculus, cloak bag, patera, cooking pot and "netted object"

A military pack carried by legionaries. The pack included a number of items suspended from a furca or carrying pole. Items carried in the pack included:

- Loculus: a leather satchel
- Waterskin: Roman camps would typically be built near water sources, but each soldier would have to carry his water for the day's march in a waterskin.
- Food: each legionary would carry some of his food. Although a Roman army on the move would typically have a baggage train of mules or similar to carry supplies such as food, legionaries were required to carry about 15 days worth of basic food supplies with them.
- Cooking equipment: including a patera, cooking pot and skewer.
- Entrenching tools: Carried by legionaries to construct fortifications and dig latrines etc. Each legionary would typically carry either a shovel (batillum) or dolabra (mattock) for digging, a turf cutting tool or a wicker basket for hauling earth.
- Sudis: stakes for construction of camps

== Other ==
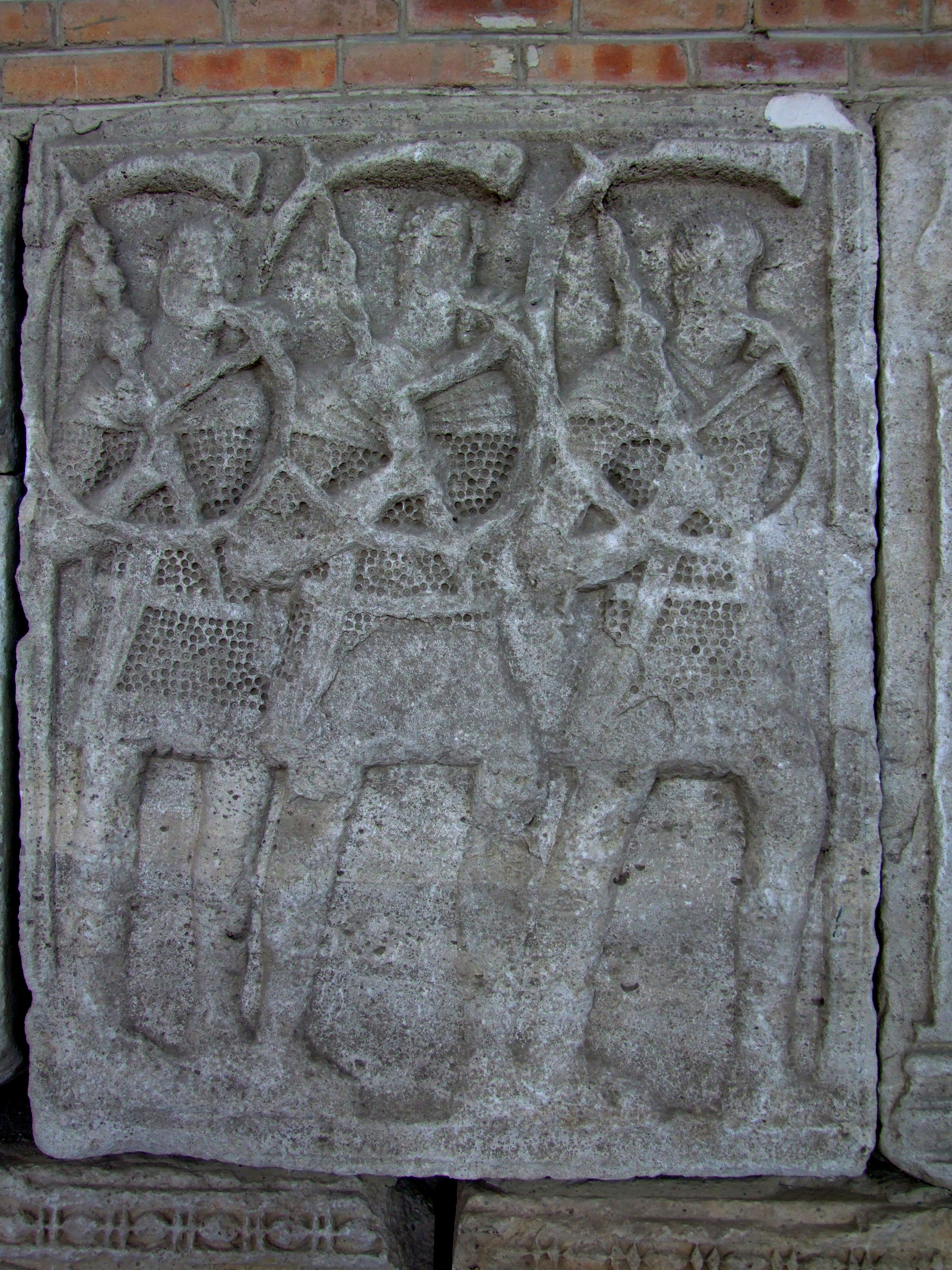
Buccina

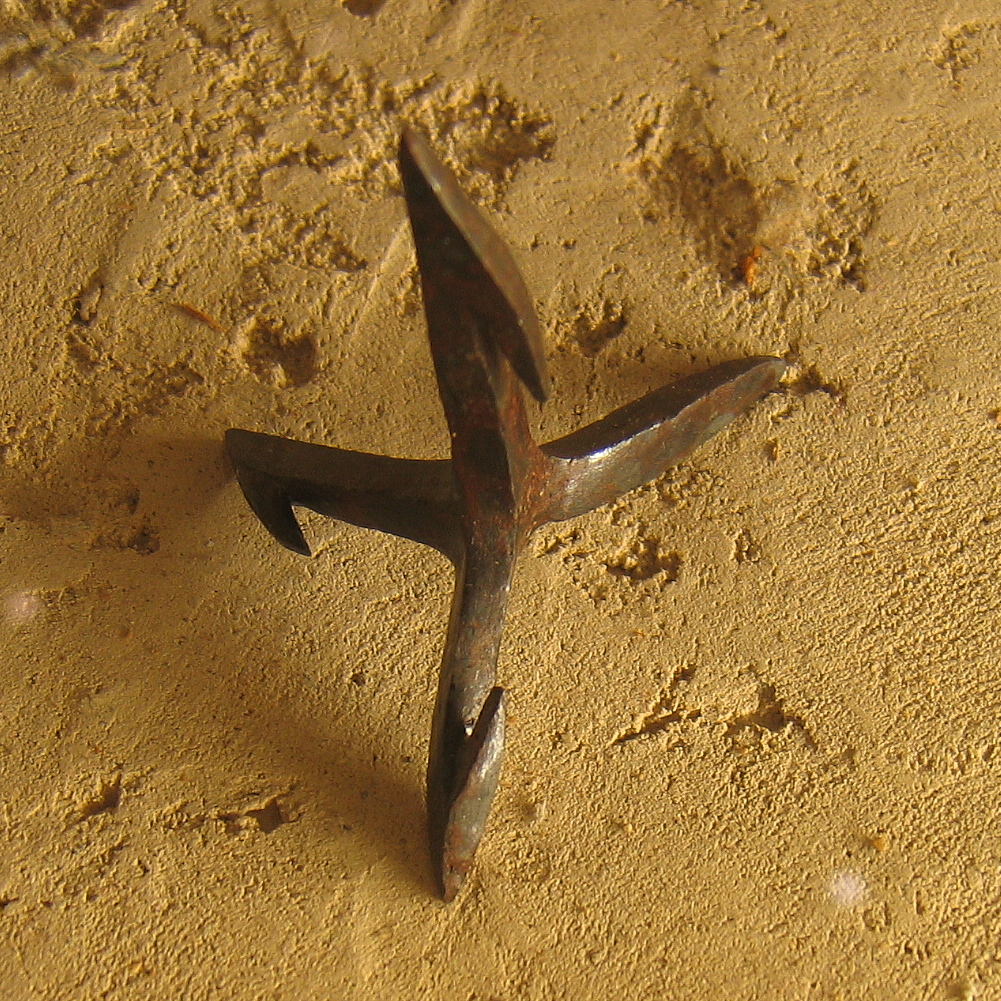
Roman iron caltrop

=== Ballista ===
The ballista was a powerful catapult, consisting of a beam with a frame at the end, mounting two rigid arms powered by torsion in bundles of sinew at each side, which would pull a bowstring between them propelling the projectile. It launched heavy darts called bolts, or spherical stone projectiles of various sizes. Ballistas were fit with grappling hooks to seize enemy vessels during the Roman civil wars. The Romans would develop an improved version with inward facing arms in the 3rd century, the remains of such were found in the town of Hatra in Iraq.

=== Scorpio ===
The scorpio was a torsion-powered catapult-type weapon, similar to a smaller ballista, which fired bolts capable of piercing enemy shields and armour. The Roman army supplied 60 to each legion and they were used both offensively during sieges and defensively as part of the Romans' field camp defenses. They were also mounted on ships and carriages to provide support to infantry.

=== Onager ===
The onager was a torsion-powered siege engine in which a sinew or horse hair spring mounted on a wooden frame swung an arm vertically against a stop, hurling projectiles in a high arc. It launched stones from a cup or sling, and it was named after a species of Asiatic ass due to its kick.

=== Buccina ===
A brass instrument used in the ancient Roman army. It was originally designed as a tube measuring some 11 to 12 feet in length, of narrow cylindrical bore, and played by means of a cup-shaped mouthpiece. The tube was bent around upon itself from the mouthpiece to the bell in the shape of a broad C and was strengthened by means of a bar across the curve, which the performer grasped while playing, in order to steady the instrument; the curves over his head or shoulder.

The buccina was used for the announcement of night watches and various other announcements in the camp.

The instrument is the ancestor of both the trumpet and the trombone. The German word for trombone, Posaune, is derived from buccina.

=== Tribulus ===
A tribulus (caltrop) was a weapon made up of four sharp nails or spines arranged in such a manner that one of them always pointed upward from a stable base (for example, a tetrahedron). Caltrops served to slow down the advance of horses, war elephants, and human troops. It was said to be particularly effective against the soft feet of camels.

The late-Roman writer Vegetius, in his work De Re Militari, wrote:

The scythed chariots used in war by Antiochus and Mithridates at first terrified the Romans, but they afterwards made a jest of them. As a chariot of this sort does not always meet with plain and level ground, the least obstruction stops it. And if one of the horses be either killed or wounded, it falls into the enemy's hands. The Roman soldiers rendered them useless chiefly by the following contrivance: at the instant the engagement began, they strewed the field of battle with caltrops, and the horses that drew the chariots, running full speed on them, were infallibly destroyed. A caltrop is a machine composed of four spikes or points arranged so that in whatever manner it is thrown on the ground, it rests on three and presents the fourth upright.

== Miscellaneous ==
- Roman military standards
- Vexillum
- Vine staff

== See also ==
- Military of ancient Rome
- Technological history of the Roman military
