= Cingulum militare =

Ancient Roman military garb

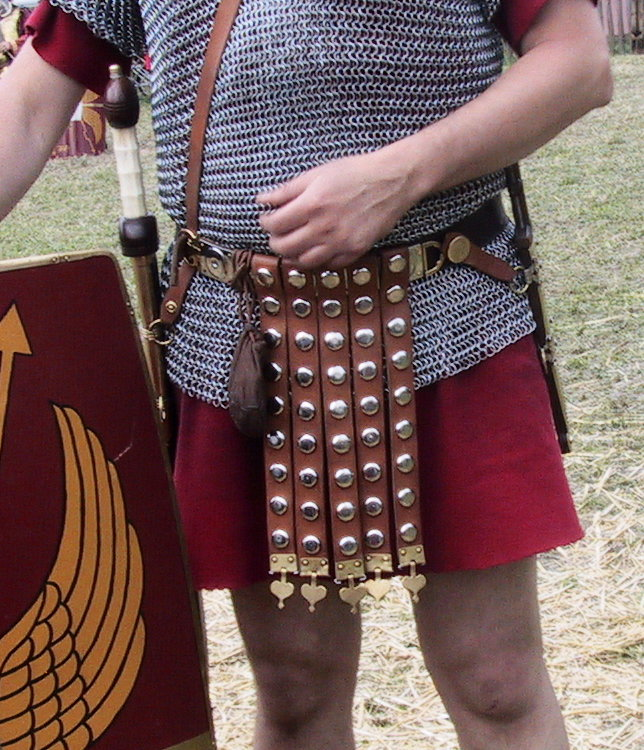
A modern cingulum militare replica

A cingulum militare was a piece of ancient Roman military equipment in the form of a belt decorated with metal fittings, which was worn as a badge of military status by soldiers and officials. Many examples were made in the Roman province of Pannonia.

The belt was composed of the following parts:

1. Balteus: Hanging band that was compounded for an overall band.
2. Bulla: Rivets on the baltea.
3. Pensilium: Pendant at the end of the straps of the belt.
4. Lamna: Discus at the end of each apron strip that embrace the pensilium.
5. Fibula: Buckle of the belt.

The cingulum militare was used in conjunction with the helmet (galea), the shield (scutum), the overall armor on the upper body (lorica hamata), a dagger (pugio), and a sword (gladius).

== See also ==
- Roman military personal equipment
- Lorica segmentata

== Bibliography ==
- Sommer, Markus (1984). Die Gürtel und Gürtelbeschläge des 4. und 5. Jahrhunderts im römischen Reich [Belts and belt fittings from the 4th and 5th centuries in the Roman Empire]. Bonn, pp. 83-118.
