= Imperial helmet =

Helmet worn by ancient Roman legionaries

Development of the legionary helmet or galea
- Montefortino; Coolus; Imperial; Imperial Gallic; Imperial Italic

The Imperial helmet-type was a type of helmet worn by Roman legionaries. Prior to the Empire, Roman Republican soldiers often provided their own equipment, which was passed down from father to son. Thus, a variety of equipment, from different eras was present in the ranks. Even as the professional Imperial army emerged, and short-term service citizen soldiers became rare, useful equipment was never discarded. So when the improved Imperial helmet appeared, it replaced what remained of the very old Coolus type, which was largely superseded at the time by improved versions of the Montefortino helmet type, which continued to serve alongside it for a time. This constituted the final evolutionary stage of the legionary helmet (galea).

== Sub-classification ==
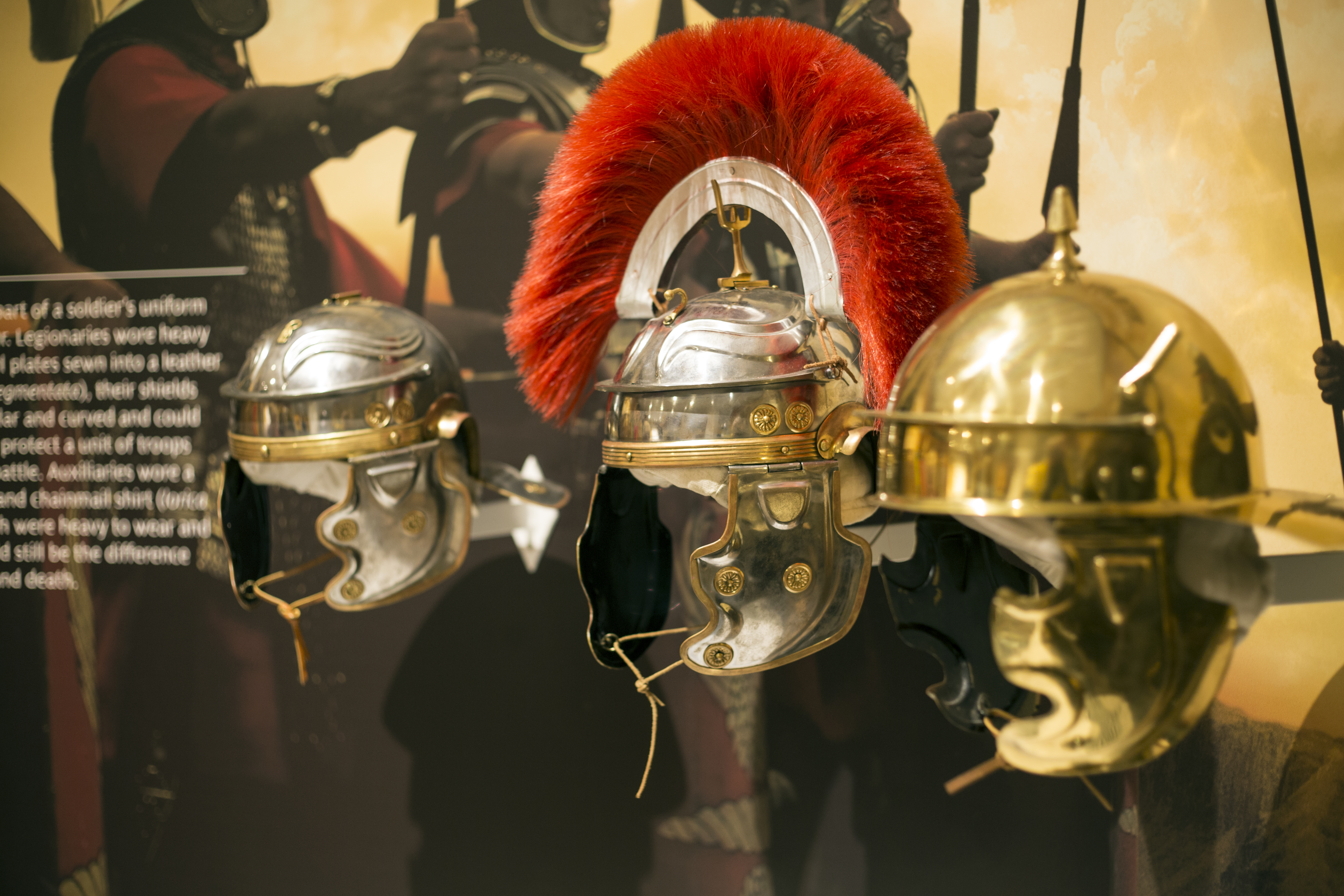
Various Roman Galeas

The term Imperial helmet was coined by H. Russell Robinson (1920-1978), who further sub-divided this main type into two principal sub-types: "Imperial Gallic" (late-1st century BC to early-2nd century AD) and "Imperial Italic" (late-1st century BC to early 3rd century AD).

The names "Gallic" and Italic" reflect the helmets' putative main manufacturers, rather than their wearers – Robinson believed that "Imperial Gallic" helmets (featuring a pair of distinctive embossed eyebrows on the forehead region and tending to be carefully made and elaborately decorated) were the products of Celtic craftsmen in Gaul whereas "Imperial Italic" helmets (lacking the eyebrows and somewhat more roughly made) were the product of less-skilled copycats in Italy and elsewhere in the Empire. These differences in decoration and workmanship tended to diminish over time; the last two Italic types classified by Robinson, the Hebron (Italic G) and Niedermörmter (Italic H) helmets, were as carefully crafted and well-decorated as any Imperial Gallic helmet.

== Development ==
Although derived from a Celtic original, the Imperial helmet had more advanced features, such as a sloped neck guard with ribbing at the nape, projecting ear guards, brass trim, and decorative bosses.

The Roman combat experience of the Dacian wars produced further developments in helmet design, particularly the two iron bars riveted crosswise across the helmet skull (alternatively, two thick bronze strips might be riveted to the top of a bronze legionary or auxiliary helmet); it has been suggested that this form of reinforcement was added as protection against the falx.

This started as a field modification, as seen on several Imperial Gallic helmets with the crossbars hastily riveted right over the decorative eyebrows (crossbars are seen on some, though not all, of the legionary helmets on Trajan's Column), but quickly became a standard feature, found on all helmets produced from ca. AD 125 through the latter 3rd century AD.

== Imperial Gallic ==
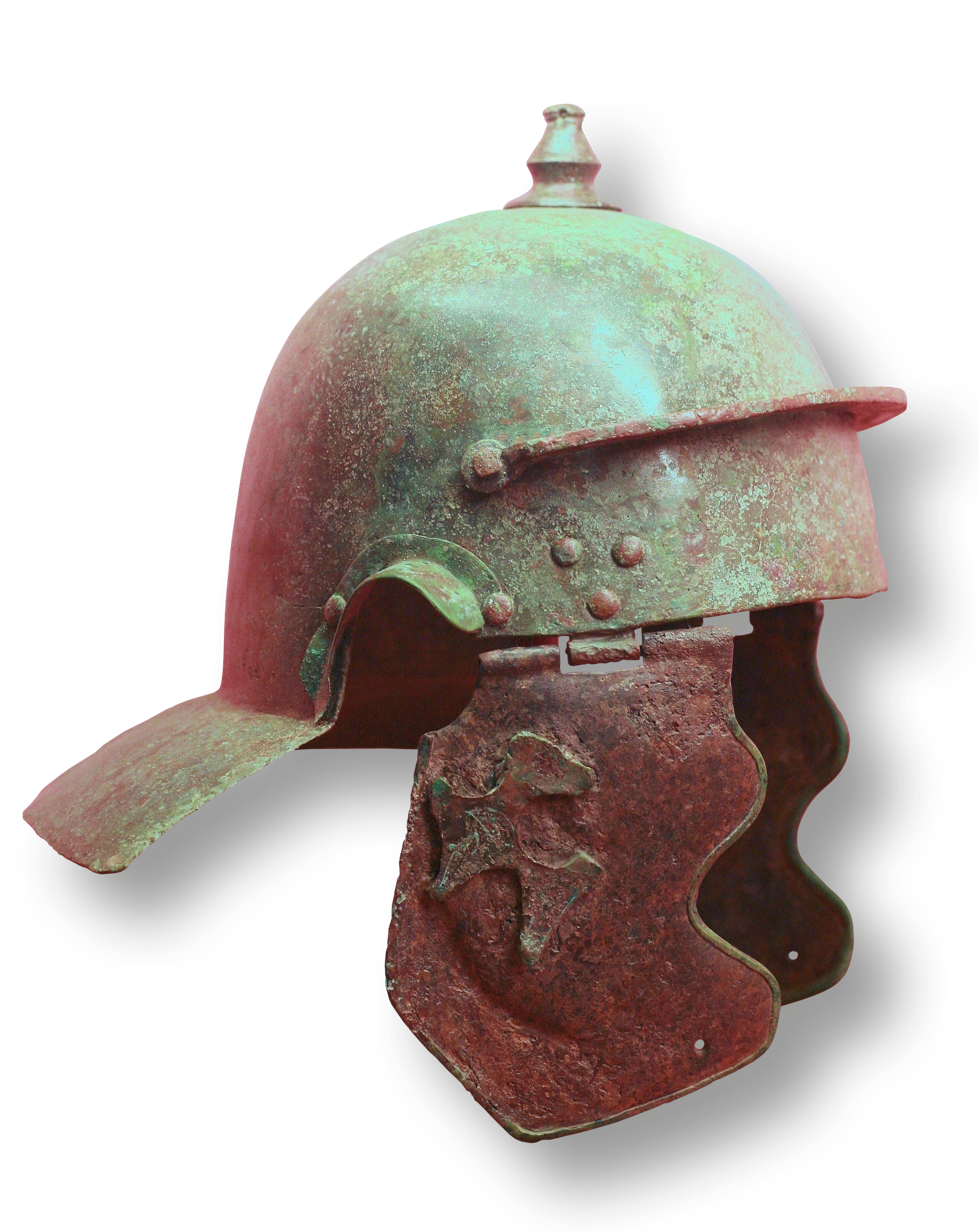
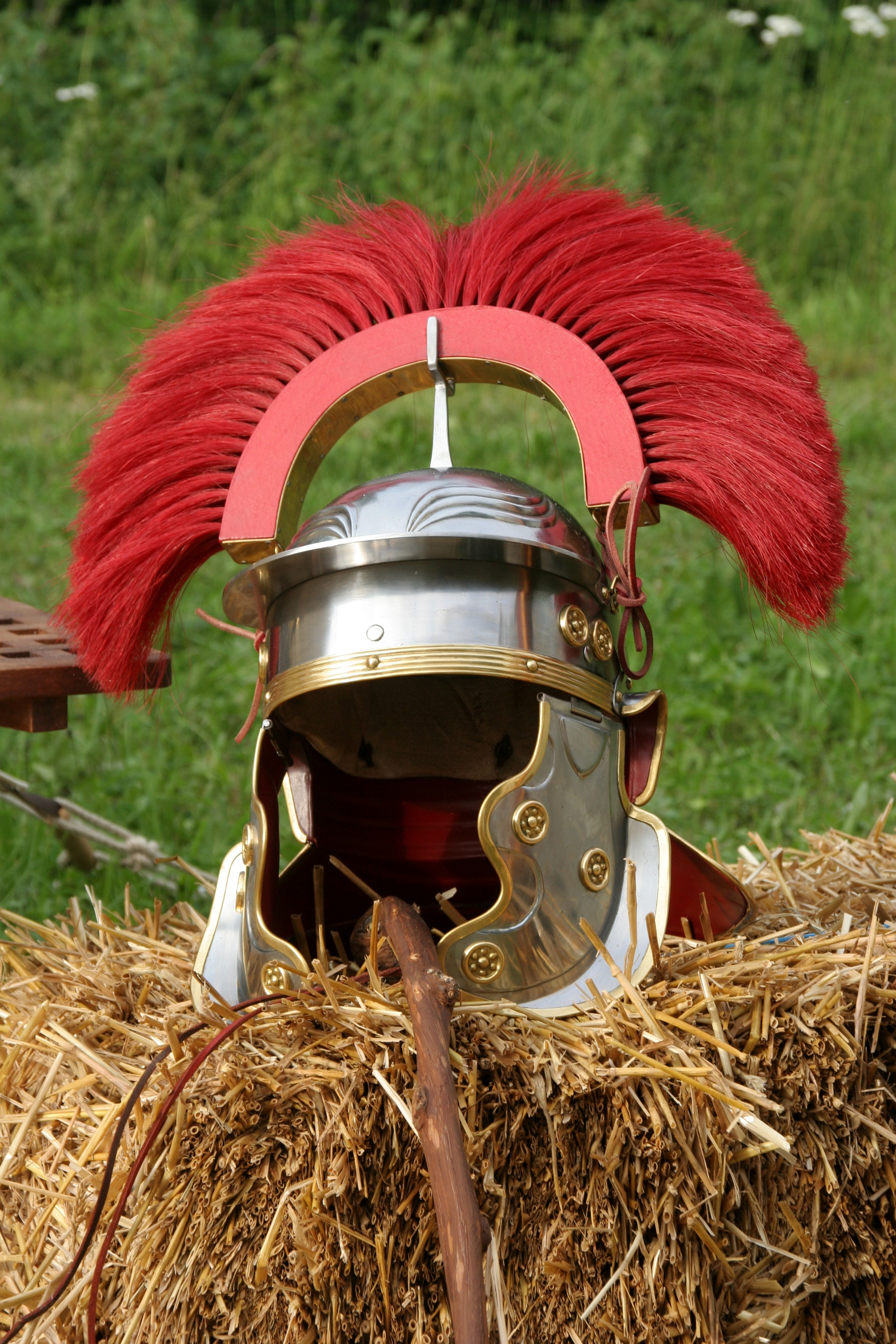
Imperial Gallic helmets

=== Imperial Gallic G ===
Robinson considered this the "typical mid-first century legionary helmet" (although the Coolus/Montefortino was probably more common) and it seems to have continued in use on into the early 2nd century AD. The best example was found in the Rhine River at Mainz-Weisenau and is now exhibited in Worms. Fragments of helmets of this style were found in rubbish pits at Colchester (now reassembled and displayed at the Colchester Castle Museum) and so can definitely be dated to the Boudican revolt of AD 61, though they lack the Weisenau example's carrying handle, which probably makes the Weisenau one later. The Weisenau example's brass rosettes resemble those found on the lorica segmentata in the Corbridge hoard.

=== Imperial Gallic H ===
This helmet is similar in design to the Gallic G, but features a different style of eyebrows and a more sloping neck guard. The most complete example of this type is from Lech, near Augsburg, Germany. Other datable helmets indicate a trend toward these more sloping neck guards in the last half of the 1st century, which continued through the 2nd and 3rd centuries. However, as both styles of neck guard were clearly used side by side, it was likely a matter of personal preference and/or armoury issue of what type could be worn by a particular Roman soldier.

=== Imperial Gallic I ===
This helmet dates to the same period as the Imperial Gallic H, and is essentially the same design, but is made in the cupric alloy "orichalcum" (brass) instead of iron. Like several other helmets, the original was found in the River Rhine at Mainz, including one with the inscription of a soldier named L. Lucretius Celeris of Legio I Adiutrix (a legion which was stationed at Mainz from 71 to 86 AD, dating the helmet to this period). Although its crest attachment was missing, a round imprint suggests a soldered on disc, indicating it had an Italian style "twist on" crest holder, rather than the Gallic style "slide-on" crest. Three orichalcum helmets of this style are known. All three show evidence of feather holders, which occur only rarely on iron ones, and it may be possible that in the late 1st century when iron helmets seem more common, the brass helmets and feather tubes suggest a higher rank, perhaps that of optio.

== Imperial Italic ==
=== Imperial Italic D and E ===
The type D helmet was decorated with gilded motifs, yet appears to have been mass-produced. A second very similar cheek piece has been found, as well as a complete helmet (Imperial Italic E) which appears to have had the same style decoration, though most had been stripped off when it was discarded. This helmet is often depicted in modern artwork as a centurion's headpiece, but the surviving fore and aft crest attachment hooks suggest it belonged to a regular soldier. Because it is so distinctive, it is sometimes stated that it may have been a special item for a particular unit such as the Praetorian Guard. More likely, the Italic D was the product of a single workshop producing a more decorative type for soldiers who might wish to shell out a bit more for splashy headgear. Since the Italic D has integral brass cross-braces placed flat against the skull, providing a double-thickness of metal at a critical point, it is tempting to speculate that the superior performance of this type versus the Dacian falx is what led to the decision to retrofit cross bracing to all helmets in the Dacian theatre.

=== Imperial Italic G ===
The original example of this distinct type was found in a cave near Hebron, West Bank, Palestinian territories, and as it was probably war-loot of the Jewish Zealots of the Bar Kochba Revolt under Hadrian, can be closely dated. It is the earliest Roman helmet discovered in which the post-Dacian Wars crossbars were probably part of the original construction, as evidenced by the brass lunate decorations applied between the crossbars.

=== Imperial Italic H ===
The Niedermörmter helmet, classified by Robinson as Imperial Italic H, is one of the best-preserved Roman Imperial helmets to have survived from antiquity. Made of bronze (an iron version reportedly resides in a private collection), the helmet is heavily decorated and has a neck guard which is far deeper than usual. The cross bracing across the skull is actually embossed, rather than applied, and there is a rather unusual dome-shaped knob where the braces meet at the crown of the head. This helmet is typically dated to the late Antonine or Severan eras, c. AD 180–235, but the find context of the helmet is unknown and the dating is based solely on its typology (i.e. it looks about 40–60 years down the evolutionary trail from the Italic G).

== Bibliography ==
- Robinson, Russell (1975). The Armour of Imperial Rome. London: Arms and Armour Press. ISBN 978-0-684-13956-2.
- Connolly, Peter (1998). Greece and Rome at War. London: Greenhill Books. ISBN 1-85367-303-X.
- Goldsworthy, Adrian (2007). The Complete Roman Army. London: Thames & Hudson. ISBN 978-0-500-05124-5.
- Webster, Graham (1985). The Roman Imperial Army of the first and second centuries A.D. Totowa: Barnes & Noble. ISBN 0-38920-590-7.
- Sumner, Graham; D'Amato, Raffaele (2009). Arms and Armour of The Imperial Roman Soldier - From Marius To Commodus, 112 BC - AD 192. Barnsley: Pen & Sword. ISBN 1-84832-512-6.
- Junkelmann, Marcus (1986). Die Legionen des Augustus. Mainz: Philipp von Zabern. ISBN 3-8053-0886-8.
