= Batillum =

Ancient Roman iron shovel

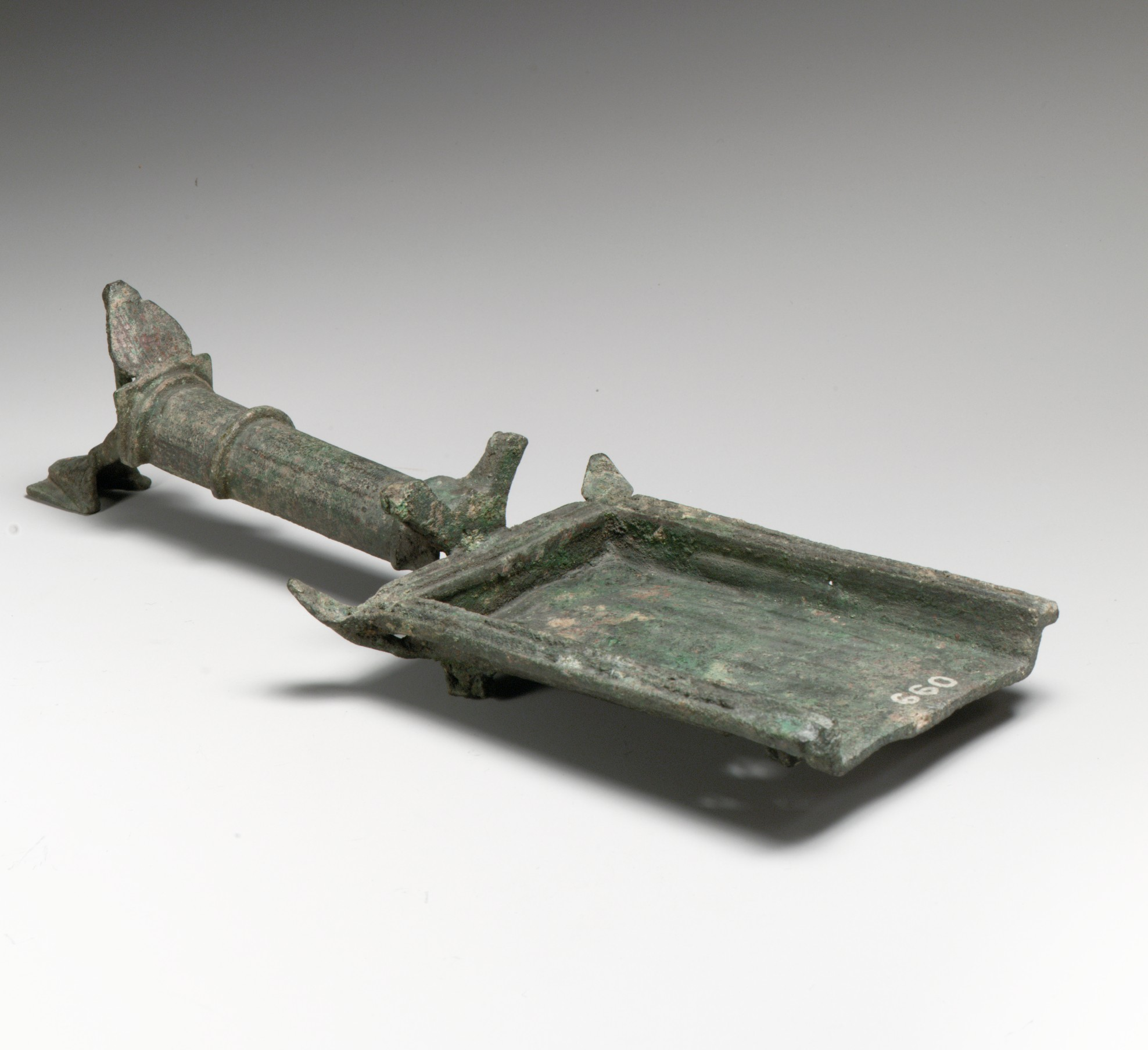
Bronze batillum, late 1st–early 2nd century A.D.

A batillum or vatillum was an ancient Roman iron shovel with a short handle used for various purposes, especially as a fire-shovel, chafing-dish, and for burning incense.

== Etymology ==
The name is possibly related to battualia "the exercise of soldiers and gladiators in fighting and fencing" which is related to the English verb to beat or to vase a vessel (in some Latinate languages 'b' and 'v' can be interchangeable).

== See also ==
- Entrenching tool
- Roman military personal equipment
