= Pugio =

Roman dagger

The pugio (Latin: [ˈpuːɡioː]; plural: pugiones) was a dagger used by Roman soldiers as a sidearm. It seems likely that the pugio was intended as an auxiliary weapon, but its exact purpose for the soldier remains unknown though it seems it could have been used for close quarters fighting. Officials of the empire took to wearing ornate daggers in the performance of their offices, and some would wear concealed daggers for defense in contingencies. The dagger was a common weapon of assassination and suicide; for example, the conspirators who stabbed Julius Caesar used pugiones. The pugio developed from the daggers used by the Cantabrians of the Iberian peninsula.

== Etymology ==
The word pūgiō derives from the word pungo. The root of the word is pug. The word derives from the Proto-Indo-European root *peuĝ. It is still possible to use punch and stab synonymously in many Indo-European languages (even English, namely the "jab" in boxing); hence, Latin pugnus and Greek πυγμή pygmḗ mean "fist". The Smith article cited below proposes that the pugio was the weapon grasped by the fist; however, the Latin word for swordplay was pugna, an exchange of thrusts without the intermediary of fists, although it could also be a fistfight.

== Usage ==
Like the gladius, the pugio was probably an advanced stabbing weapon, the type of weapon said to have been preferred by the Romans. Of them, late Roman writer Vegetius said it "was the method of fighting principally used by the Romans"

== Forging ==
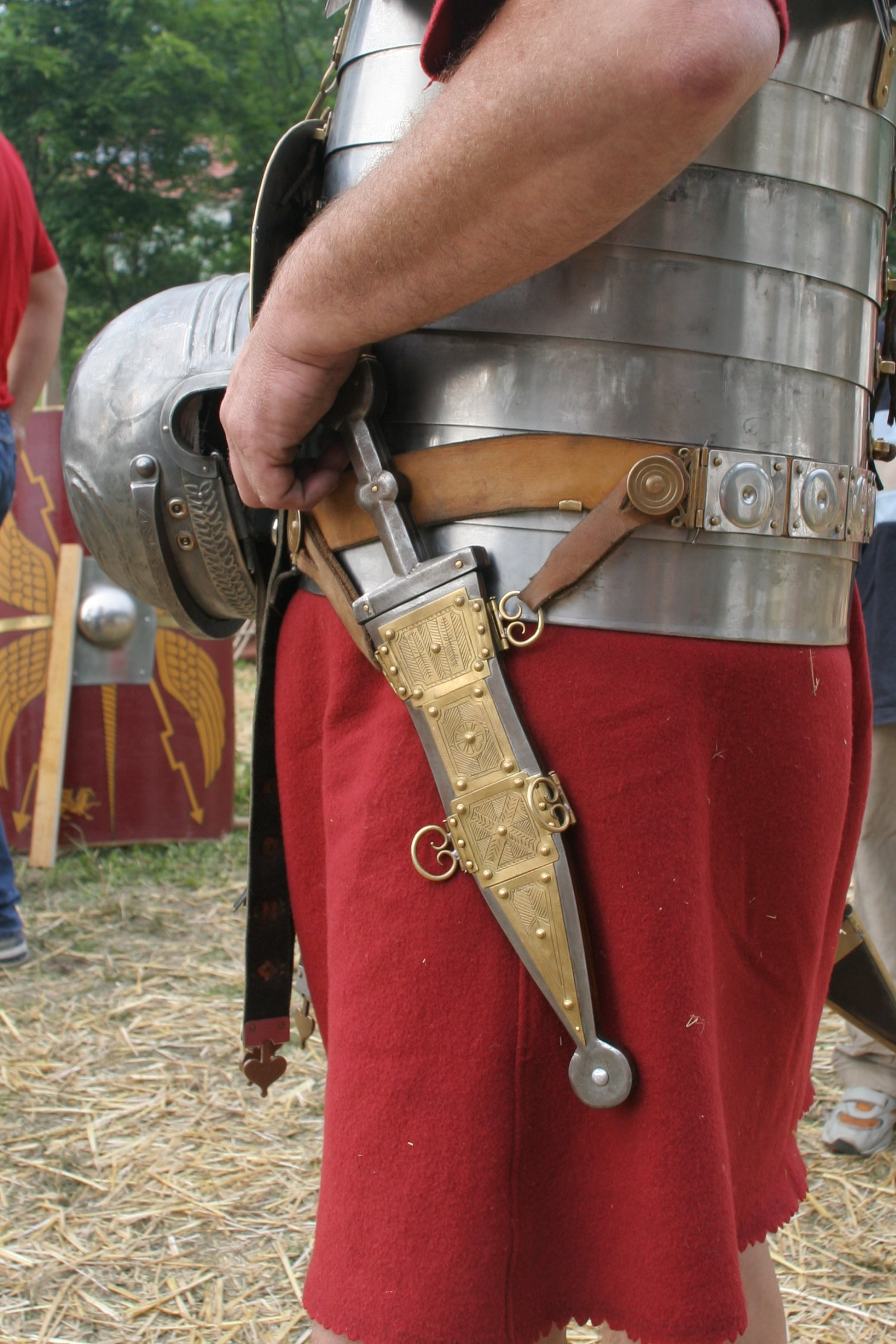
Pugio reconstruction

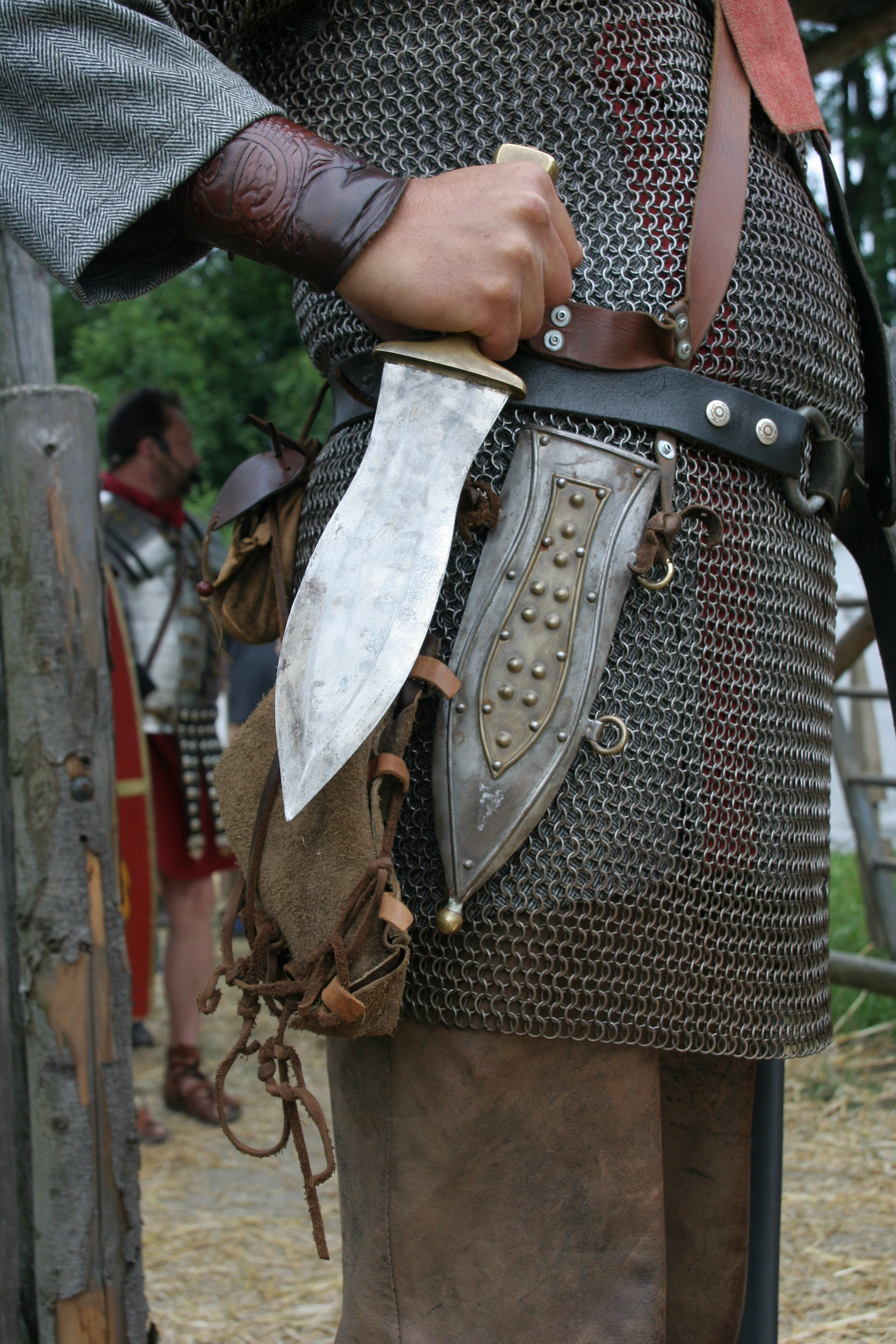
Reconstruction of a 2nd-century AD pugio

By the early 1st century, the pugio typically had a large blade. There were different kinds of blades. One type was "leaf-shaped." Another type had narrow parts near the shoulders, which ran parallel to about half the blade's length before narrowing to a sharp point. Midribs ran close to the length of each side, either standing out from the face or sunken and defined by grooves on either side. The tang was wide and flat and a grip was riveted through it, as well as through the shoulders of the blade. The pommel was originally round but by the early 1st century, it was replaced by a round and trapezial pommel. Which was often topped by three decorative rivets.

By the second quarter of the 1st century AD, three types of sheaths were in use. All of these had four suspension rings and a bulbous terminal expansion which was pierced by a large rivet. Evidence shows that the two lower rings were unused. The first type was made with a curving metal plate that was usually made of iron at both the front and back of the sheath. This plate surrounded wooden "lining." The front plate was usually heavily decorated with inlaid brass, silver, niello and red, yellow or green enamel. These sheaths featured round free-running suspension rings, attached by bifurcated mountings which were riveted on. Modern reconstructions of these sheaths which feature applied brass plates attached by rivets are incorrect and nothing of this type has ever been found.

The second type was a wooden sheath, probably covered with leather. One metal plate was attached to the front of the wooden sheath. This plate was fairly flat and was heavily decorated with inlaid silver and enamel. Occasionally tin was used. The suspension rings resembled small Roman military buckles and were hinged to the sides of the sheath. The third type, called frame type, was made of iron and consisted of a pair of curved channels which ran together at the lower end of the sheath, where they were normally worked into a flattened round terminal expansion and pierced with rivet. There is an example from Titelberg whose channels have been inserted into a bulbous terminal formed with a ferule to accept the channels before a decorated rivet has been used to fix all three elements together. The channels were joined by two horizontal bands at the top and middle of the sheath and these bands also retained the suspension rings. These sheaths would have been built around a wooden core, which does not survive in the archaeological record.

Like other items of legionary equipment, the dagger underwent some changes during the first half of the 1st century AD. Rod tangs were introduced, and the hilt was no longer riveted through the tang but was instead secured only at the shoulders of the blade. This in itself caused no great change to the pugio's appearance, although the archaeological evidence strongly suggests that the rod tang was less secure and that handles attached in this way could become detached, a possibility that may be proved by the existence of two surviving pugiones from different sites which both retain replacement handles, one of which is a recycled sword grip. Some of the blades associated with rod tangs were narrower (under 4.5 cm (1.8 in) wide), with little or no waisting, or reduced or virtually non-existent midribs (type "C" blades).

Throughout the period, the outline of the hilt remained essentially the same. Like the earlier period, it was made with two layers of horn, wood or bone sandwiching the tang, each overlaid with a thin iron plate, which could either be solid, becoming thinner at both the guard and the pommel expansion, which was roughly trapezial in shape, or made of thin metal embossed to this shape. The hilt was often decorated with silver inlay. The hilt is 10 to 13 cm (3.9 to 5.1 in) long overall and, though the grip is quite narrow, the presence of an expansion in the center of the grip provides for a very secure hold.

In size, the pugio ranged from 18 to 28 cm (7.1 to 11.0 in) long and 5 cm (2.0 in) or more in width.

== See also ==
- Roman military personal equipment
- Parazonium

== Sources ==
- PUGIO, article in Smith, Dictionary of Greek and Roman Antiquities, online at ancientlibrary.com.
- MC Bishop and JCN Coulston - 'Roman Military Equipment (2nd Edition)', Armatura Press, 2006
- I. Scott - 'Roman Military Daggers' in 'A Catalogue of Roman Iron Tools, Weapons and Fittings in the British Museum, 1985
- J. Obmann - 'Studien zu Roemischen Dolchscheiden des 1. Jahrhunderts n. Chr.', Koelner Studien Zur Archaeologie Der Roemischen Provinzen, 2000
