= Mainz Gladius =

Famous ancient Roman sword and sheath found in the Rhine in Germany

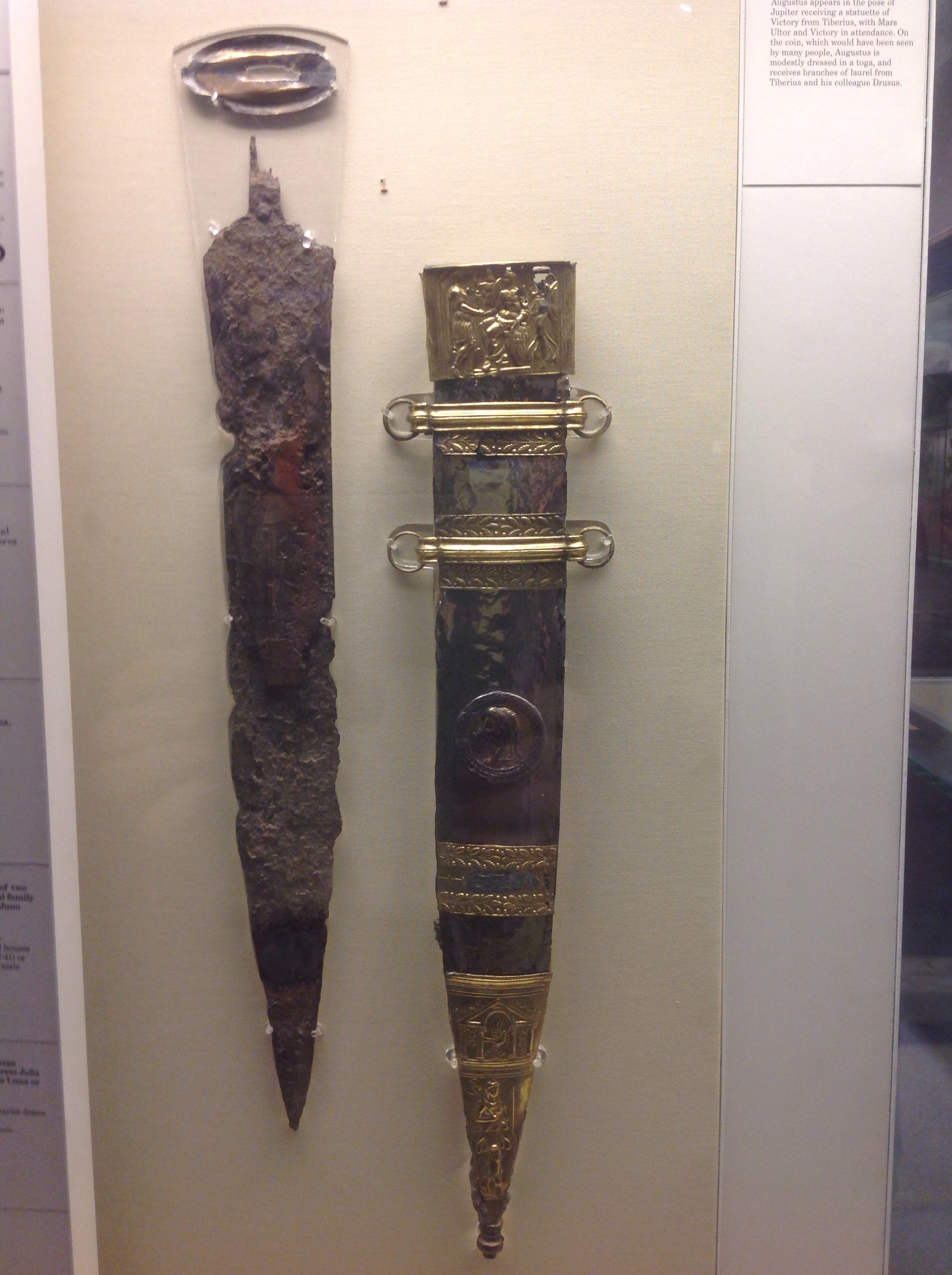
- The Mainz Gladius on display at the British Museum, London
- Material: Iron and gilded bronze
- Size: 58 cm long
- Created: 15 BC
- Present location: British Museum, London
- Registration: 1866,0806.1

The Mainz Gladius or Sword of Tiberius is a famous ancient Roman sword and sheath that was found in the Rhine near Mainz in Germany. Since 1866 it has been part of the British Museum's collection, when it was given to the museum by the philanthropist Felix Slade. A replica of the Mainz Gladius can be found in the Romano-Germanic Central Museum (Mainz). The type of gladius was first introduced to the Romans in 20 BC. Eventually the Mainz Gladius was overtaken in popularity by the Pompeii gladius.

== Description ==
The sword is made of iron (now heavily corroded) and the sheath of tinned and gilded bronze. The blade was 50–55 cm (20–22 in) long, 7 cm (2.8 in) in width, and 65–70 cm (26–28 in) in overall length, with a weight of 800 g (28 oz). The point of the sword was more triangular than the Gladius Hispaniensis. The Mainz Gladius still had wasp-waisted curves. The decoration on the scabbard illustrates the ceding of military victory to Augustus by Tiberius after a successful Alpine campaign. Augustus is semi-nude, and sits in the pose of Jupiter, flanked by the Roman gods of Victory and Mars Ultor ('the Avenger'), while Tiberius, in military dress, presents Augustus with a statuette of Victory.

== Ownership of the sword ==
In the past, this sword was thought a prestigious weapon, likely to have been commissioned by a senior officer in the Roman army to celebrate a victory in the lengthy and bloody military campaigns in Germany. Victory in these campaigns was essential for the expansion and protection of the Roman Empire's border, and the symbolic act of presenting these victories to the emperor avoided the destructive rivalry between generals which had previously brought down the Roman Republic. This theory was based on the impressive decoration of the piece. However, there are no precious metals used in it and nowadays, there is plenty of evidence that such richly decorated Roman military equipment was in common use with rank and file soldiers as well, as long as they could afford it.
