= Galea (helmet) =

Ancient Roman helmet

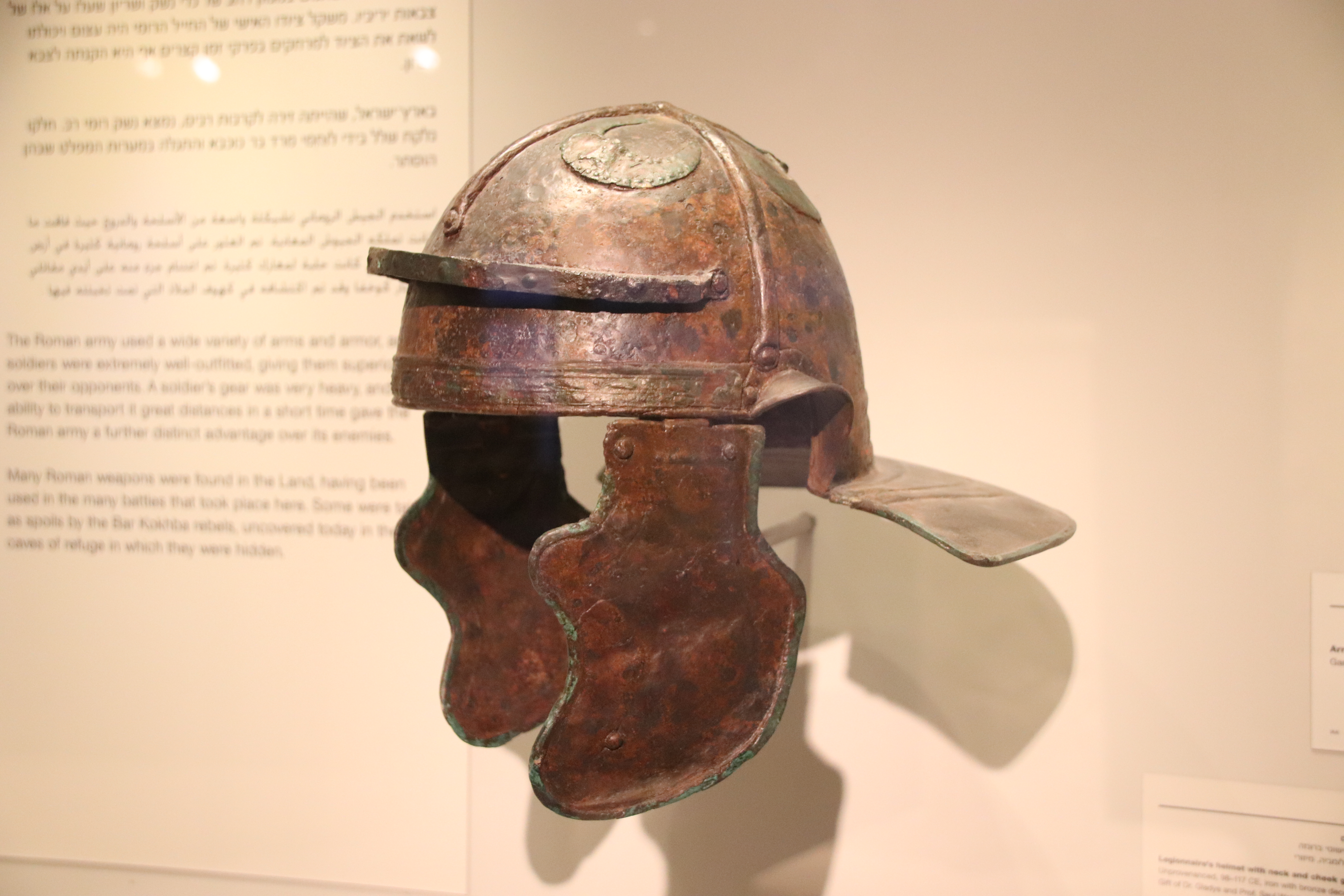
Roman galea from first century

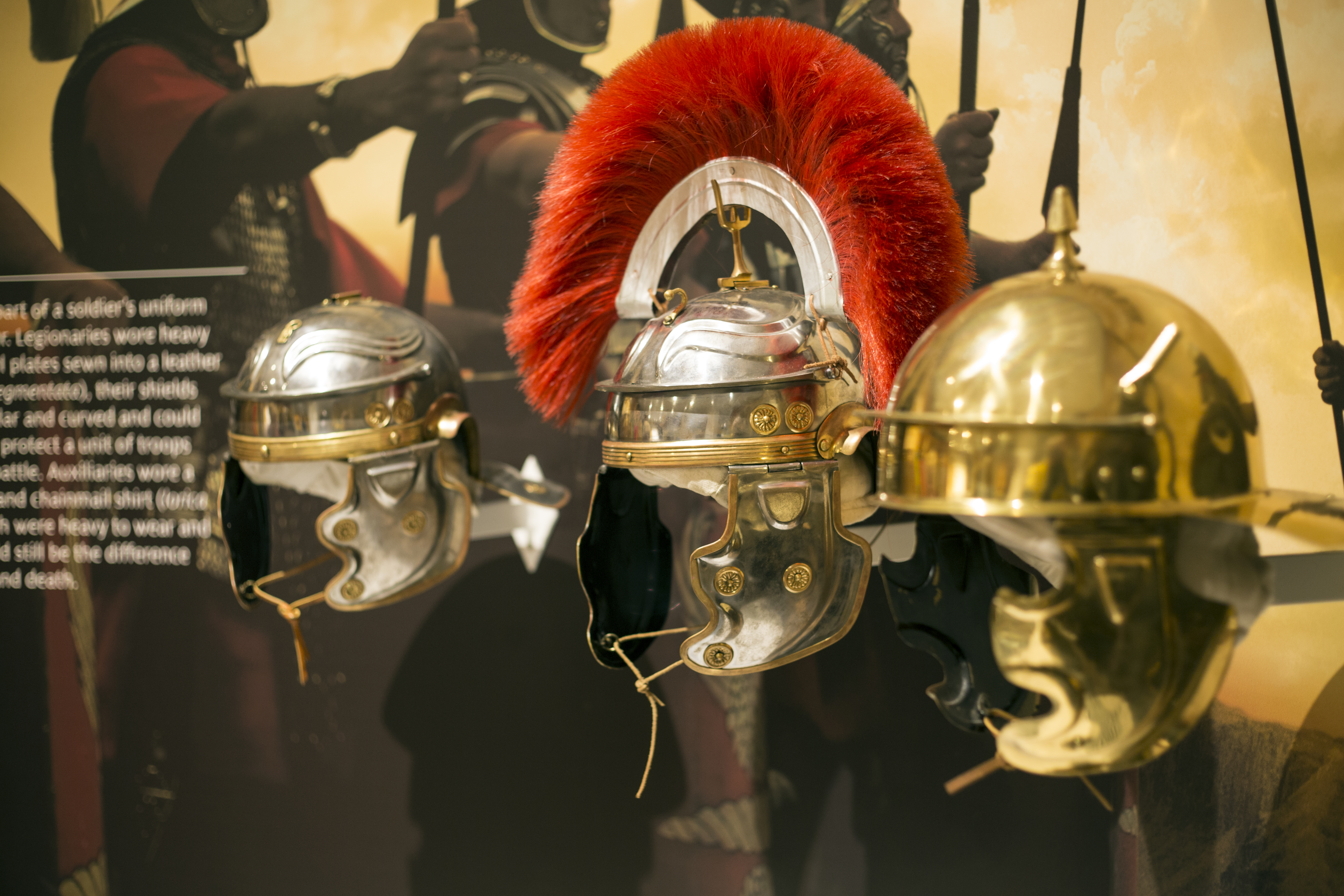
Various replica galeas

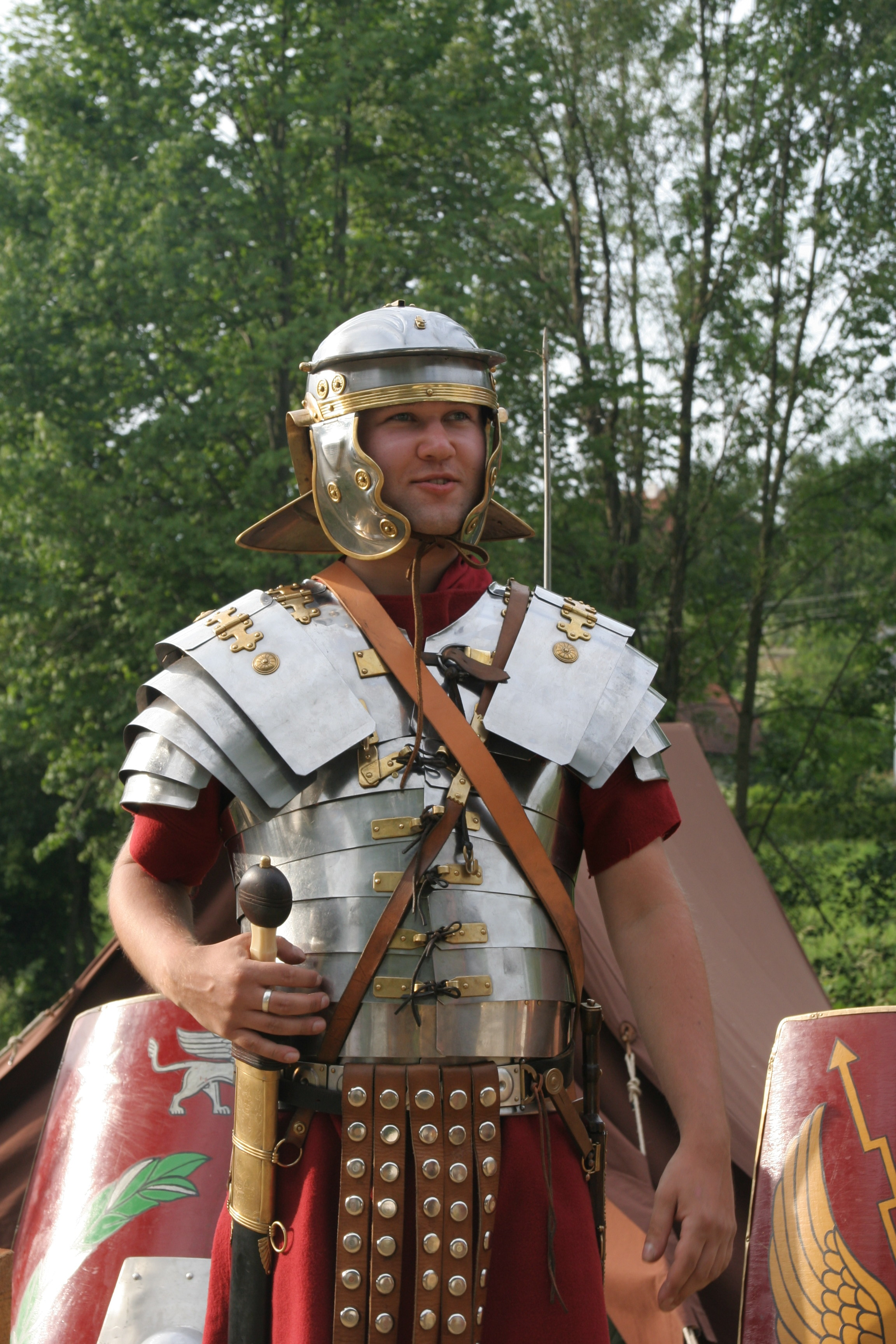
Reenactor wearing replica Roman galea

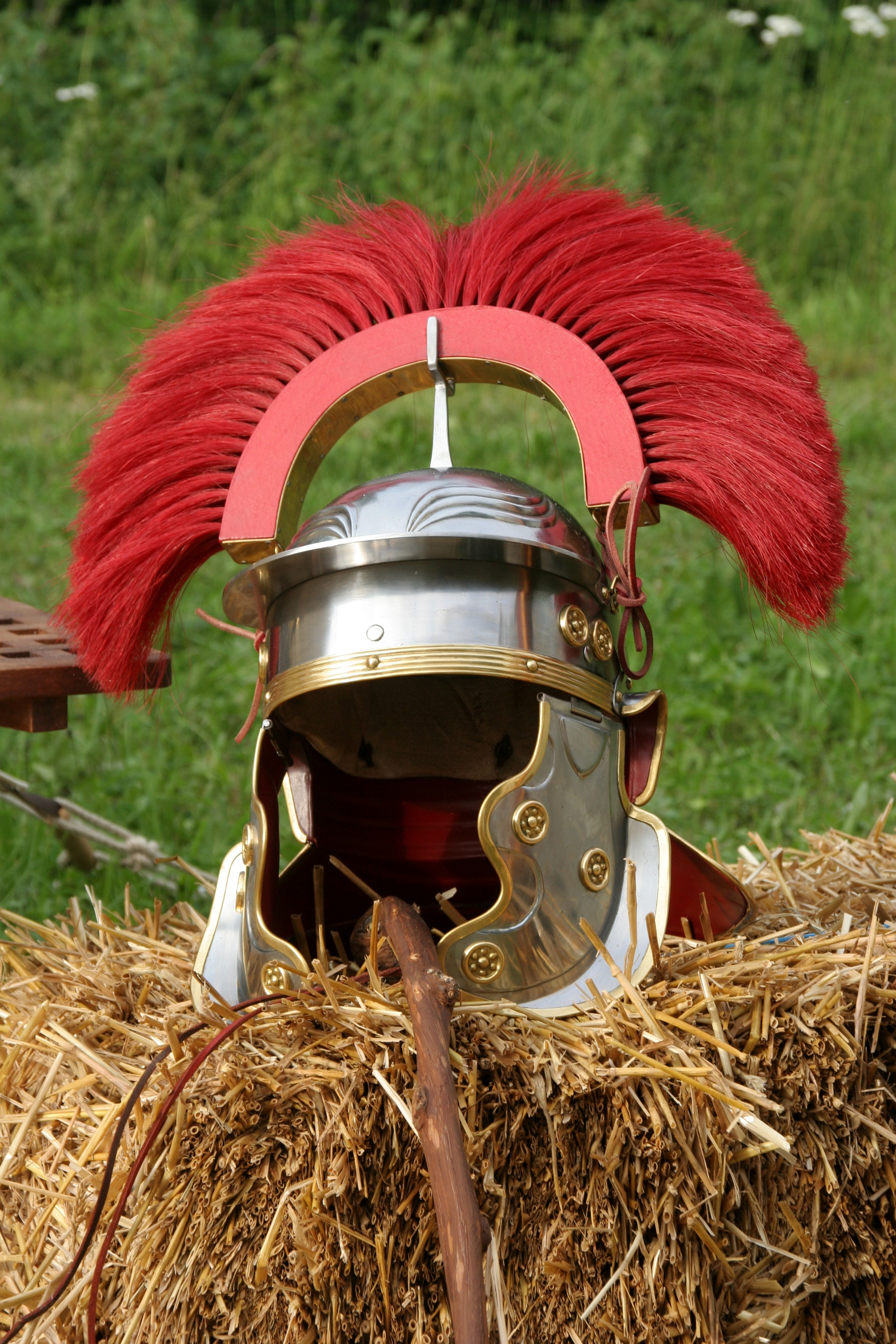
Modern reconstruction of a centurion's helmet, first century. The embossed eyebrows and the circular brass bosses are typical of the Imperial Gallic helmets.

A galea (Latin: [ˈɡaɫea]; from Ancient Greek γαλέη (galéē) 'weasel, marten') was a Roman soldier's metal helmet, most famously worn by the heavy infantry of the legions. Some gladiators, specifically murmillo (myrmillo), also wore bronze galeae with face masks and decorations, often a fish on its crest. While details varied over time, all Roman galeas from the Republic era through the Principate featured the same basic design - a bowl to protect the skull, a neck guard (which grew larger over time), a deflector band to protect the forehead and cheek plates to protect the face. The exact form, type of metal, and design of the helmet varied over time, between differing unit types, and also between individual examples – pre-industrial production was by hand – so it is not certain to what degree there was any standardization even under the Roman Empire.

Originally, Roman helmets were influenced by the neighboring Etruscans, people who utilised the "Nasua" type helmets. The Greeks in the south also influenced Roman design in its early history.

The primary evidence is scattered archaeological finds, which are often damaged or incomplete; secondary evidence includes period depictions of galeae, generally in bas-relief sculpture and mosaic.

== Helmet types ==
H. Russell Robinson in his book The Armour of Imperial Rome, published in 1975, classified into broad divisions the various forms of helmets that were found. He classified four main types of helmets for heavy infantry (with subcategories named with letters) and thirty different types of cheek guards.

Helmets used by gladiators were quite different from military versions.

=== Legionary infantry helmets ===
- Montefortino helmet (4th century BC – 1st century AD)
- Coolus helmet (3rd century BC – at least 79 AD)
- Imperial Gallic helmet (late 1st century BC – early 2nd century AD)
- Imperial Italic helmet (late 1st BC – early 3rd century AD)
- Ridge helmet, first depicted on coins of 4th-century AD emperor Constantine I

== Helmet crests ==
Some of the helmets used by legionaries had a crest holder. The crests were usually made of plumes or horse hair. While the fur is usually red, the crests possibly occurred in other colors, like yellow, purple and black, and possibly in combinations of these colors such as alternating yellow and black. Gladiators such as the samnis and the hoplomachus also probably wore large feathered crests.

There is some evidence (Vegetius' writings and some sculptures) that legionaries had their crests mounted longitudinally and centurions had them mounted transversely. Crests may have been worn at all times by centurions in the early empire, including during battle, but legionaries, and centurions during other periods, probably wore crests only occasionally.

== See also ==
- Aquila – Roman military standard
- Gladius – Roman short sword; Latin word meaning "sword"
- Scutum – Type of shield used in Ancient Rome
- Vexillum – Military standard of the ancient Roman army

== General and cited references ==
- Robinson, H. Russell (1975). The Armour of Imperial Rome. New York: Charles Scribner's Sons. ISBN 0-684-13956-1.
