= Montefortino helmet =

Variety of Celtic/Roman military helmet

The original Montefortino helmet, held in Arcevia.

The Montefortino helmet was a type of Celtic, and later Roman, military helmet used from around 300 BC through the 1st century AD with continuing modifications. This helmet type is named after the region of Montefortino (frazione of Arcevia) in Italy, where a Montefortino helmet was first uncovered in a Celtic burial (photo). The Montefortino helmet originated in the 4th century BCE and was influenced by Etruscan and Celtic helmets. The helmet was brought to Italy by the Senones and it was the most popular helmet amongst the Roman army during the Republican period. The Montefortino helmet remained the most popular Roman helmet until the first century CE. Although in the Roman military it was replaced by the Coolus helmet, it continued to be used by the Praetorian guard.

== Design ==
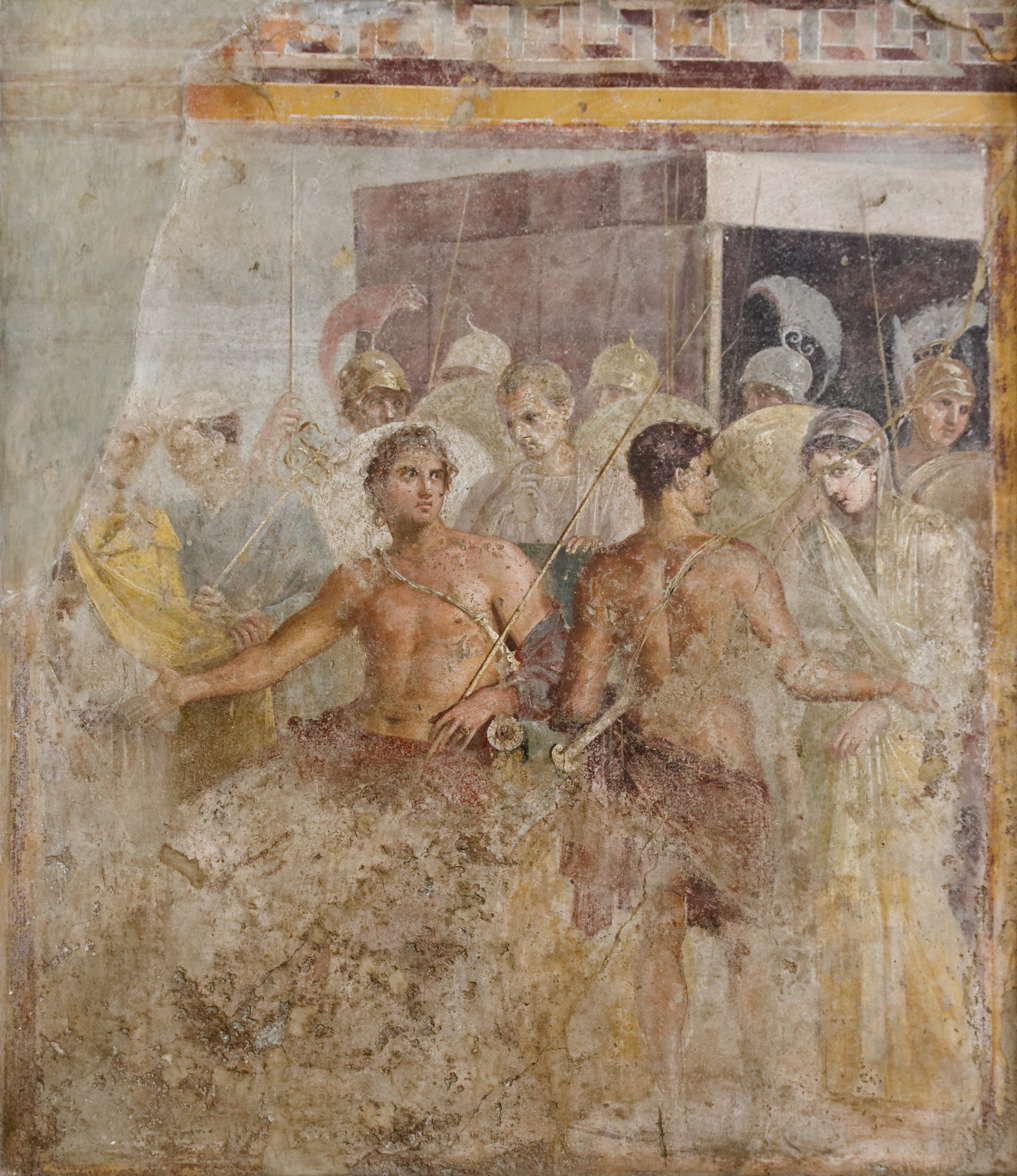
Achilles' surrender of Briseis to Agamemnon, from the House of the Tragic Poet in Pompeii, fresco, 1st century AD, now in the Naples National Archaeological Museum; soldiers in the background can be seen wearing the Montefortino helmet

Development of the legionary helmet or galea
- Montefortino; Coolus; Imperial; Imperial Gallic; Imperial Italic

Montefortino helmets are generally characterized by a conical or round shape with a raised central knob, and a protruding neck guard as well as cheek plates to protect the sides of the head. The cheek pieces were attached to the helmet through D-shaped rings riveted to the rear of the helmet. Plumes were attached to the raised central knob. It had a curved head to deflect sword blows and arrows and a neck guard to protect against slashes. Other common features include a "rope"-type pattern around the edge, and "pinecone"-type patterning on the crest knob. Note that the classifications are those used by archaeologists, rather than Celts or Romans, who, if they did distinguish among these types, have left no known record of the terms they used.

In the Roman Republic, the Montefortino helmet was the first stage in the development of the galea, derived from Celtic helmet designs. Similar types are to be found in Spain, Gaul, and into northern Italy. Surviving examples are generally found missing their cheek pieces (probably because they were made of a perishable material which has not survived, e.g., leather) though a pair of holes on each side of the helmet from which these plates would have hung tend to be clearly identifiable, and examples which do include cheek pieces show clearly how these holes were used.

Roman versions sometimes contain inscriptions of the name of the soldier who wore the helmet. Earlier helmets in the type are generally more decorated, as the Republican legions were composed of levied men who paid for their own equipment. As the Roman army moved into the huge period of growth at the end of the 2nd century BC, cheap, undecorated but effective helmets needed to be mass-produced for the mainly poor legionaries.

== Sub-types ==
- Canosa
- Rieti: This type was the first to evince inscriptions identifying them clearly as Roman.
- Buggenum, c. 1st Century BC: These simple and practical helmets clearly belong to the Montefortino type and are thought to have been used during the time of Caesar contemporaneously with the Mannheim sub-type of Coolus helmet. The neck guards of this type are wider, and the crest knobs tend to be hollow in contrast to the solid ones of the earlier types.
- Hagenau, circa 1st Century AD: These hybrid helmets still show the typical shape of Montefortino helmets, but the neck guard becomes substantially wider, and some incorporate a reinforcing strap across the brow, as well as a carrying hook or handle at the back.
