= Coolus helmet =

Type of ancient Celtic and Roman helmet

Development of the legionary helmet or galea
- Montefortino; Coolus; Imperial; Imperial Gallic; Imperial Italic

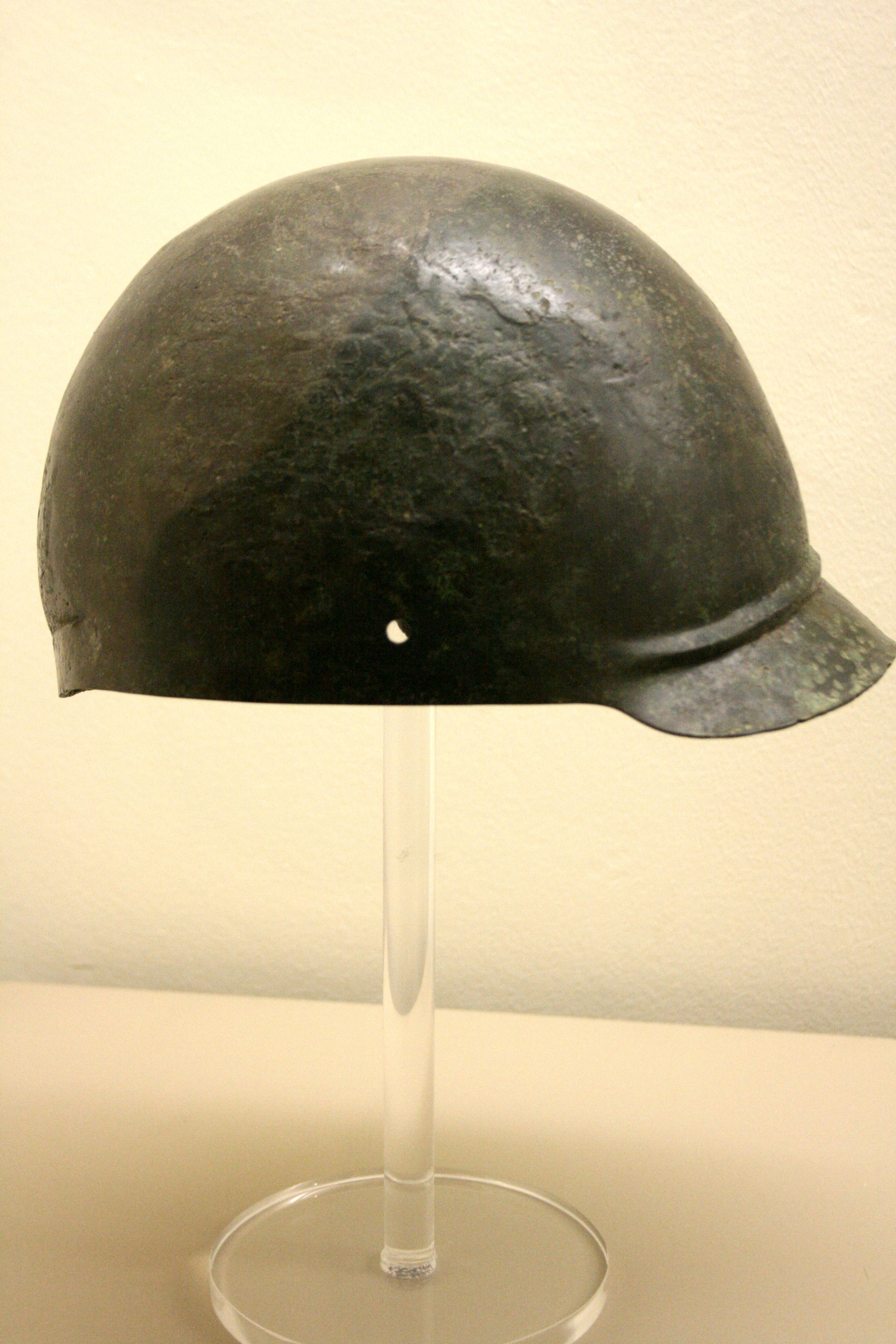
Bronze Gallic helmet, Coolus-Manheim-type; From the region of Tongeren, Belgium; Now in the Musée du Cinquantenaire, Brussels.

The Coolus helmet (named for Coolus, France) was a type of ancient Celtic and Roman helmet popular in the 1st century BCE. It was typically made in bronze or brass and, like the Montefortino type with which it co-existed, was a descendant of Celtic helmet types. The explanation of the choice to use bronze can be attributed to the type of warfare that the helmet was used for; also the cultural affinities have influence on why the helmet was made the way that it was. Within a long process of evolution, Roman military armor for the head developed from early pre-Roman helmets. Rome itself had no proper tradition of such objects, as most of the soldiers of the Early Republic made use of helmets produced by the Etruscans, whose craftsmen were known for their ability to make vessels.

It was a fairly plain globular or hemispherical helmet with a brow guard, a ribbed neck guard, and large hinged cheek guards. The cheek guards and neck guards projected outwards across the jaw and the cheeks although they did not impair the vision of the wearer. Another common feature was a turned or cast soldered- or riveted-on crest knob. The cheek guards were manufactured separately from the helmet and riveted onto it. The Coolus helmet has become a well known and recognizable part of historical warfare.

The Coolus was replaced by the Imperial helmet type, a more developed form also derived from a Celtic original.

== Examples ==
- Canterbury helmet. An Iron Age bronze helmet found near Canterbury, Kent, England, in December 2012.
- Thames Coolus helmet. A mid-1st-century AD copper-alloy Roman helmet dredged from the River Thames or its Walbrook tributary, London, in 1934.

== Sources ==
- Legio II Augusta
- Legio XXIV
