= H. Russell Robinson =

British military armourer and historian

Henry Russell Robinson (7 May 1920, Hackney, London - 15 January 1978) was a British military armourer and historian.

== Life ==
He served in the RAF during the Second World War making models interpreting aerial photographs. This was when he met Sir James Mann, Master of the Armouries at the Tower of London. Robinson joined the staff of the Tower Armouries in 1946 as a Temporary Assistant, before rising to Assistant Keeper and finally, in 1970, Keeper of Armour.

Robinson was a founder member and president of the Arms and Armour Society. In 1965, he was elected a Fellow of the Society of Antiquaries of London. In 1977, he was awarded an honorary MA by the University of Newcastle upon Tyne.

One of the roman armour reproductions produced for the 1969 Congress of Roman Frontier Studies

Between 1967 and 1969, he (a practical armourer) worked with Charles Daniels to interpret and reconstruct the Roman armour nowadays known as 'lorica segmentata'. He produced a series of reconstructions of the two sub-types of armour from the Roman site at Corbridge and one from Newstead in time for them to be exhibited at the 1969 Congress of Roman Frontier Studies held in Cardiff.

His work on the armour featured in one of his best-known books, The Armour of Imperial Rome. Published in 1975 by Lionel Leventhal at the Arms and Armour Press, it included line illustrations by his friend, Peter Connolly. Robinson's system of categorizing Roman helmets has been widely adopted in the UK and USA but never really found favour in Europe.

Robinson was not only known for Roman armour, since he worked on an exhibition of Japanese armour at the Tower Armouries and subsequently wrote two books on the subject. He was also an authority on Native American artefacts and was responsible for the production of the replica of the revised reconstruction of the Sutton Hoo helmet and wrote a guide to the Stibbert Museum.

In 1978 he teamed up with Ronald Embleton to produce an illustrated booklet entitled What the Soldiers Wore on Hadrian's Wall for the Newcastle upon Tyne publisher Frank Graham. A second, posthumous, volume by the pair appeared in 1980 from the same publisher and was entitled The Armour of the Roman Legions.

Robinson was married with two daughters. He died in Guy's Hospital on 15 January 1978, aged 57.
