= Cohors peditata =

Infantry unit of the Roman auxiliary forces

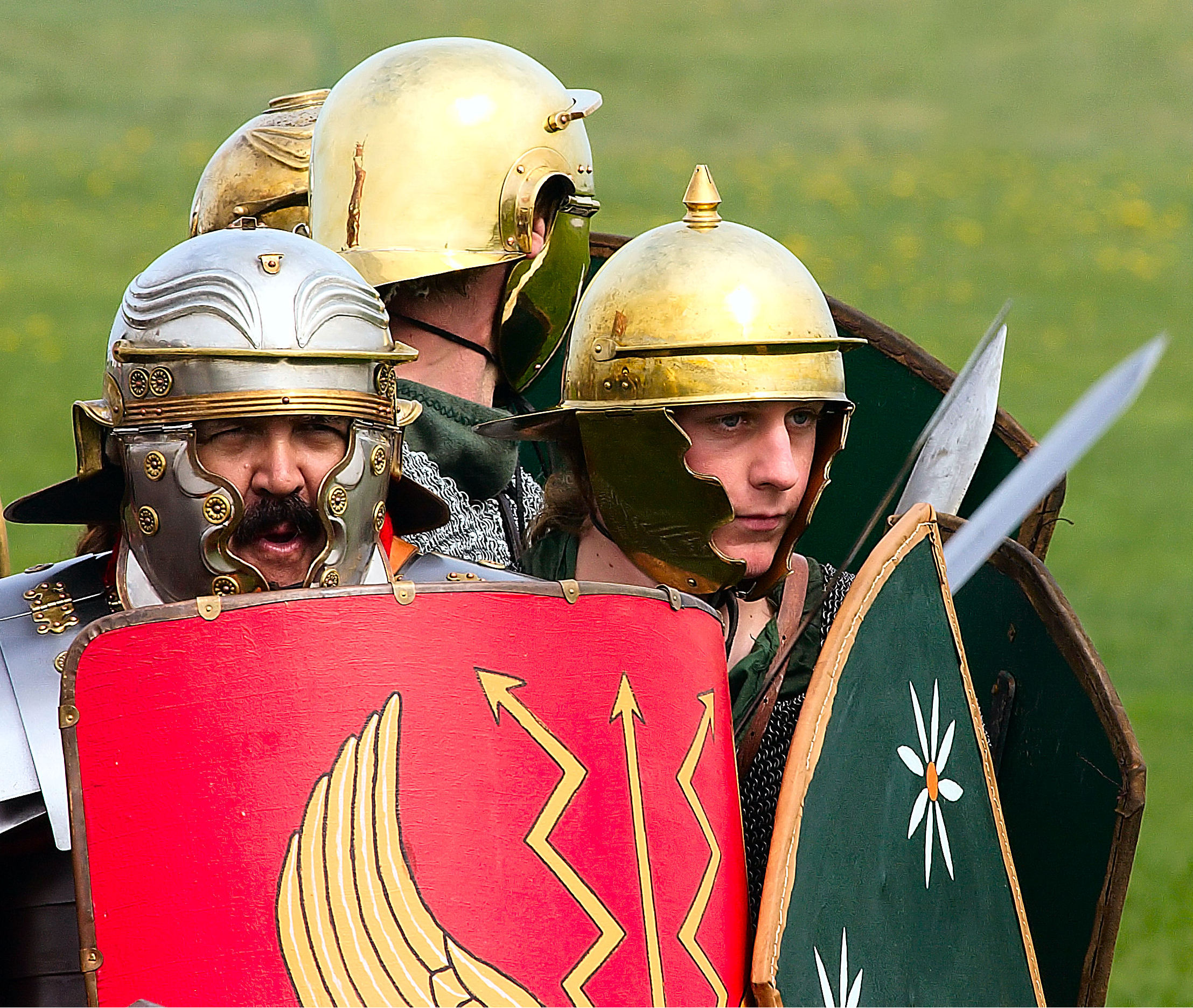
- Some Roman auxiliary infantrymen (on the right, with green shields) and a legionnaire (on the left, with a red shield).
- Active: 27 BC - 305 AC
- Country: Roman Republic and Roman Empire
- Type: infantry
- Role: combat
- Size: cohors
- Part of: Auxilia
- Patron: Mars
- Colors: Blue

The cohors peditata (Latin: cohors peditata; plural: cohortes peditatae) was a body of auxiliary units of the Roman army, composed solely of infantrymen, unlike the equitata cohort. It could consist of 500 soldiers (quingenaria) or approximately 1,000 (milliaria).

== History and internal structure ==
=== Augustan reorganization ===
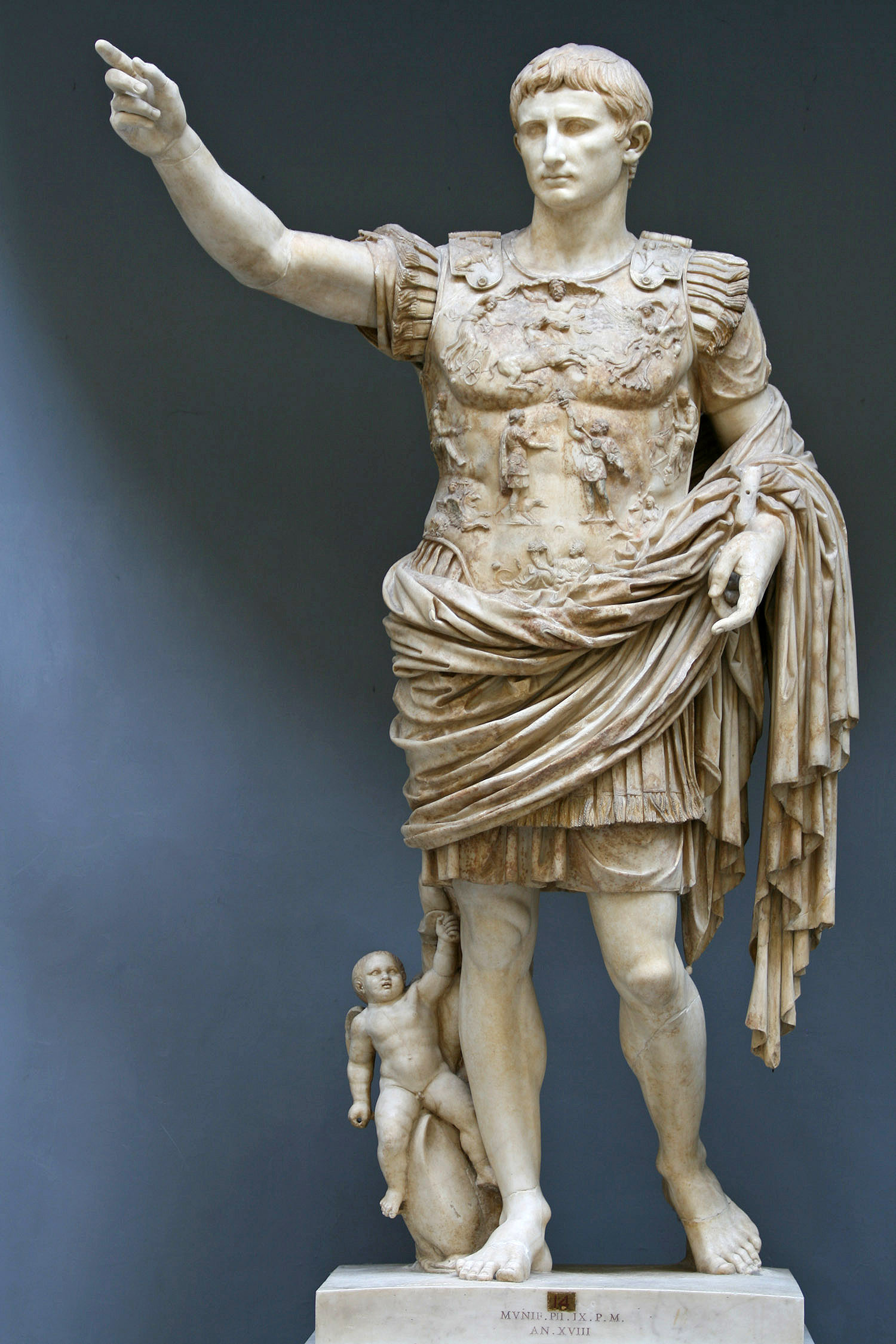
Statue of Augustus in military attire (paludamentum).

Augustus, after the Battle of Actium in 31 BC, was compelled to decide not only how many legions should remain in service but also how many auxilia troops needed to be permanently integrated into the army. Their units were subordinate to the legate of the legion while remaining distinctly separate from it.

The auxilia constituted the second fundamental component of the army. Given the degree of specialization of the legionary forces and their tactical limitations, it is clear that the auxilia were not merely additional forces but complementary to the legions (light or heavy cavalry, archers on foot or horseback, and "light infantry"). Many of these units likely did not exist before the Battle of Actium, but the names of some cavalry squadrons suggest they were recruited in Gaul by Caesar’s officers.

==== Composition ====
They were composed of infantrymen, mostly provincial (in the condition of peregrini), who aspired to obtain Roman citizenship after more than two decades of service. Although used by Caesar during the Gallic Wars, their organization, as it has been passed down to us, dates back to the reform implemented by Augustus for the entire military system.

The infantry cohorts had a structure very similar to that of the cohorts of the legions. They were initially commanded by a praefectus cohortis when they were still quingenariae and composed of peregrini, and later by a tribunus militum if milliariae or composed of cives Romanorum. The quingenariae cohorts consisted of 6 centuries of 80 men each, plus 6 centurions (including a centurion princeps) for a total of 480 infantrymen, in some cases equipped with throwing weapons (archers, slingers, and javelin throwers) to complement the heavy legionary infantry.

Starting from the Flavian dynasty, the first milliariae auxiliary units, consisting of approximately 1,000 soldiers, were introduced (created anew or by increasing the number of soldiers from a pre-existing quingenaria unit) in all their types: from the cohortes peditatae to the equitatae and up to the alae of cavalry (the latter considered the elite of the Roman army).

Type of auxiliary unit	Service	Commander	Subordinate	No. of subunits	Strength of subunit	Unit strength
Cohors quingenaria	Infantry	praefectus cohortis	Centurion	6 centuriae	80	480
Cohors milliaria	Infantry	tribunus militum	Centurion	10 centuriae	80	800

==== Internal hierarchy: officers, principales, and immunes ====
In the Augustan era, they were commanded by a native client king or prince, at least until after Tiberius, when they were then placed under a praefectus cohortis of the Equestrian order.

The troop body of a cohors quingenaria, in addition to the officers (the praefectus cohortis and six centurions), was divided into three subcategories:

- The principales, or those non-commissioned officers capable of commanding small detachments or, if necessary, taking the place of company officers. These included the imaginifer (the bearer of the emperor’s image) and probably a vexillarius (the bearer of the cohort’s vexillum), six signiferi cohortis (standard-bearers for the six centuries composing the cohort), six optiones singularium (aides to the centurions and the praefectus cohortis), and six tesserarii (one per century).
- The immunes, or those infantrymen who, although not even non-commissioned officers, were exempt from certain routine or heavy duties. These included six curatores (accountants, one per century), some musicians to relay orders, such as the cornicen, the tubicen, and the bucinator, a cornicularius (aide to the praefectus), some statores (guards for security, messengers), a librarius (clerk), an actuarius, and an unspecified number of beneficiarii (including the medicus ordinarius and possibly the capsarius).
- All other infantrymen (milites), not included in the first two categories.

According to Cheesman’s calculations, in a cohors quingenaria, apart from the praefectus cohortis, there were 6 centurions, 19 principales, and an unspecified number of immunes.

==== Service duration, pay, and discharge ====
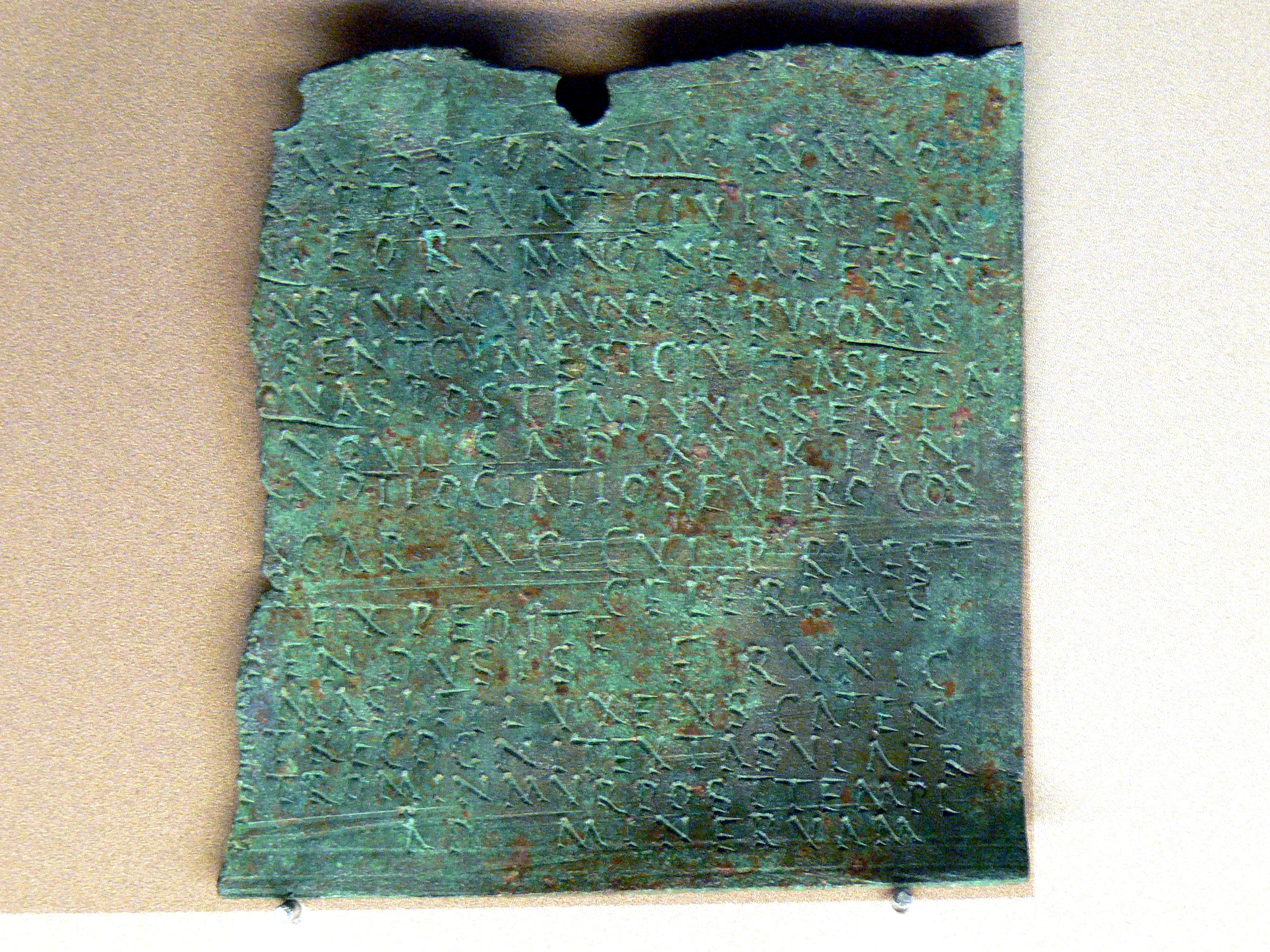
Diploma militaria of a typical cohors peditata.

Auxiliary infantrymen served for 25 years, at the end of which they received a diploma militare attesting to their discharge (honesta missio), along with a reward (in money or a plot of land, akin to a modern pension), Roman citizenship, and the right to marry. The pay (stipendium) for an infantryman of a cohors peditata was around 150 denarii (less than a legionary, who received 225 denarii annually). The pay was later increased by a quarter under Emperor Domitian, bringing the annual compensation to 200 denarii.

== Bibliography ==
Primary sources

- Appian, Guerra civile, IV.
- Caesar, De bello Gallico.
- Polybius, Histories, VI, 19–42.
- Vegetius, Epitoma rei militaris.

Secondary sources

- Birley, Eric (1966). "Alae and cohortes milliariae". Corolla memoria Erich Swoboda Dedicata. Römische Forschungen in Niederösterreich V: 54–67.
- Cascarino, G. (2007). L'esercito romano. Armamento e organizzazione [The Roman Army. Armament and Organization, Vol. I - From Origins to the End of the Republic] (in Italian). Vol. I - Dalle origini alla fine della repubblica. Rimini: Il Cerchio.
- Cascarino, G. (2008). L'esercito romano. Armamento e organizzazione [The Roman Army. Armament and Organization, Vol. II - From Augustus to the Severans] (in Italian). Vol. II - Da Augusto ai Severi. Rimini: Il Cerchio.
- Cheesman, G.L. (1914). The Auxilia during the first two century A.D. Oxford: Oxford University Press.
- Connolly, P. (1998). Greece and Rome at War. London: Greenhill Books. ISBN 1-85367-303-X.
- Dixon, K.R.; Southern, P. (1992). The roman cavalry. London: Routledge.
- Field, N.; Hook, A. (2006). Roman Auxiliary Cavalryman AD 14–193. Oxford: Osprey Publishing. ISBN 1-84176-973-8.
- Goldsworthy, A.K. (2007). Storia completa dell'esercito romano [Complete History of the Roman Army] (in Italian). Modena: Logos. ISBN 978-88-7940-306-1.
- Keppie, L. (1998). The Making of the Roman Army, from Republic to Empire. London: Batsford.
- Le Bohec, Y. (2008). L'esercito romano da Augusto alla fine del III secolo [The Roman Army from Augustus to the End of the Third Century] (in Italian). Roma: Carocci. ISBN 978-88-430-4677-5.
- Le Bohec, Y. (2008). Armi e guerrieri di Roma antica. Da Diocleziano alla caduta dell'impero [Weapons and Warriors of Ancient Rome. From Diocletian to the Fall of the Empire] (in Italian). Roma: Carocci. ISBN 978-88-430-4677-5.
- Luttwak, E. (1991). La grande strategia dell'Impero romano [The Grand Strategy of the Roman Empire] (in Italian). Milano: Rizzoli.
- Macdowall, S. (1995). Late Roman Cavalryman, 236–565 AD. Osprey Publishing.
- Webster, G. (1998). The roman imperial army of the first and second centuries A.D. Oklahoma: University of Oklahoma Press.
