= Cohors equitata =

Mixed infantry and cavalry unit of the Roman auxiliary forces

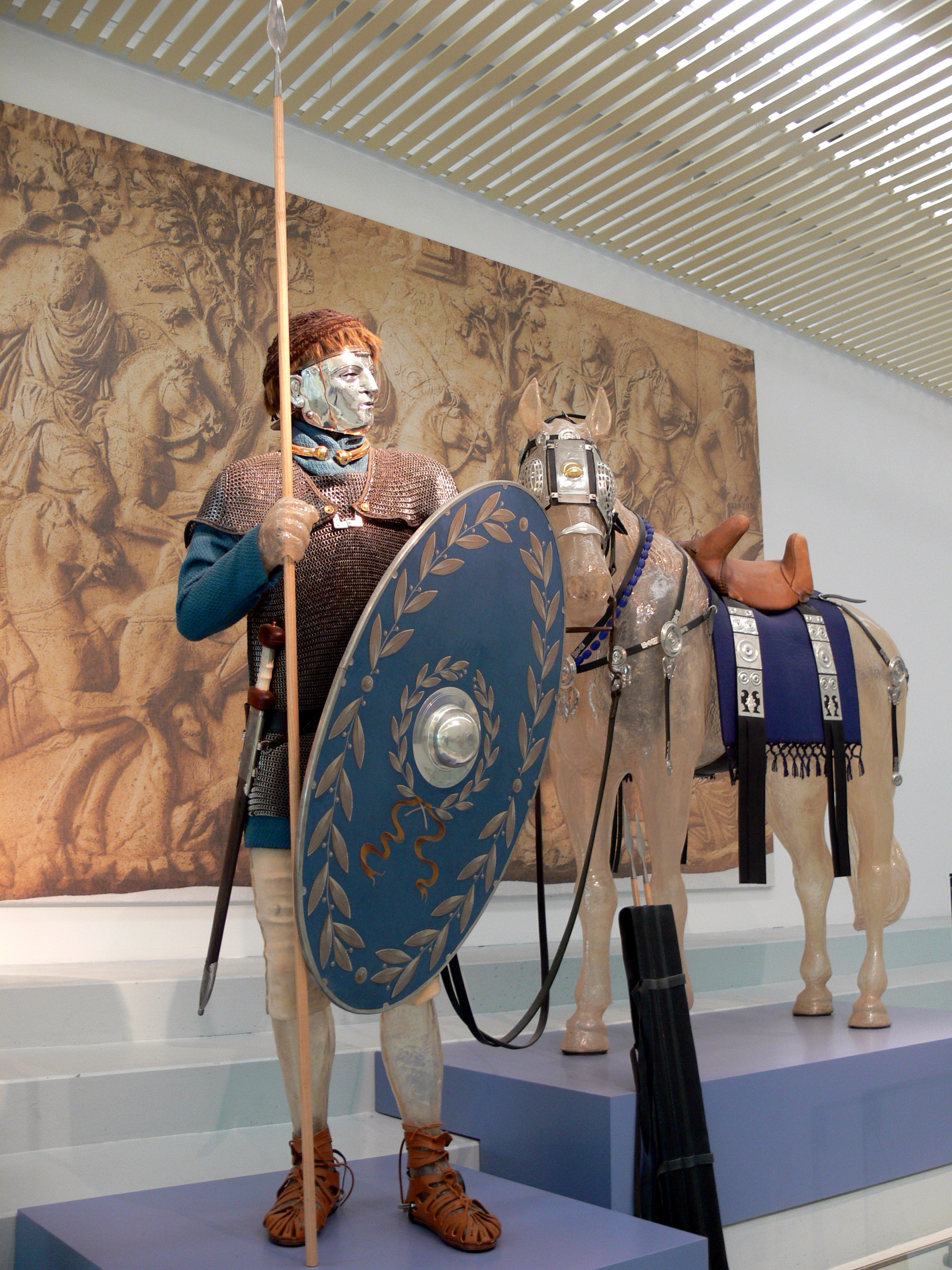
- Auxiliary cavalryman belonging to a cohors equitata or cavalry wing.
- Active: 52 BC - 305 AC
- Country: Roman Republic and Roman Empire
- Type: cavalry units flanked by infantry units
- Role: combat
- Size: cohors
- Part of: Auxilia

The cohors equitata (Latin: cohors equitata; plural: cohortes equitatae) was a body of auxiliary units of the Roman army, composed of both infantry and cavalry. It combined a cohors peditata and an ala of cavalry. It could consist of 500 soldiers (quingenaria) to approximately 1,000 (milliaria).

== History and internal structure ==
=== Republican era ===
An early example of a mixed unit of cavalry and infantry is recounted by Livy during the Siege of Capua in the Second Punic War (212–211 BC). As equestrian combat during the siege repeatedly saw the Campanian troops prevail over the Romans, a centurion named Quintus Navius initiated a new battle tactic to allow the besiegers to overcome the besieged:

From all the legions, the strongest and most agile young men were selected for their physical prowess. They were given shorter and lighter shields than those typically used by cavalry, along with seven javelins, each four feet (1.19 meters) long, with an iron tip similar to that of the velites. Each cavalryman then took an infantryman onto his horse and trained him to ride behind, ready to dismount at a prearranged signal.

— Livio. "XXVI, 4.4–5". Ab Urbe Condita.

When it was deemed that this maneuver could be executed safely through adequate daily training, the Romans advanced into the plain between their encampments and the walls of the besieged city, ready to engage the Campanian cavalry. Upon reaching javelin-throwing range of the enemy cavalry, the signal was given, and the velites dismounted suddenly; they then hurled their numerous javelins so swiftly and forcefully that they wounded many Campanian cavalrymen, who were entirely unprepared for such an attack. The speed of the assault caused more fear than actual damage among the Campanian ranks. The Roman cavalry then charged against the stunned enemy, putting them to flight and making a great slaughter up to the city gates. From that moment, it was established within the legions that there should be a unit of velites ready to support the cavalry.

Following the Social War of 91–88 BC, the granting of Roman citizenship to all populations of Ancient Italy eliminated the so-called Alae of foederati (consisting of infantry and cavalry). Consequently, there was a growing need to employ formations of "light" infantry and "auxiliary" cavalry from client or allied states (outside Italic borders), especially since, with the reform of Gaius Marius, the equites legionis had been abolished. It is no coincidence that Gaius Julius Caesar repeatedly began using contingents of cavalry from allied populations during the Gallic Wars. He recruited primarily Gauls and Germans, integrating these new units under Roman decurions, with a rank equivalent to that of legionary centurions and a praefectus equitum. The same occurred during the civil war that followed between Caesar and Pompey from 49 to 45 BC.

=== Augustan reorganization ===
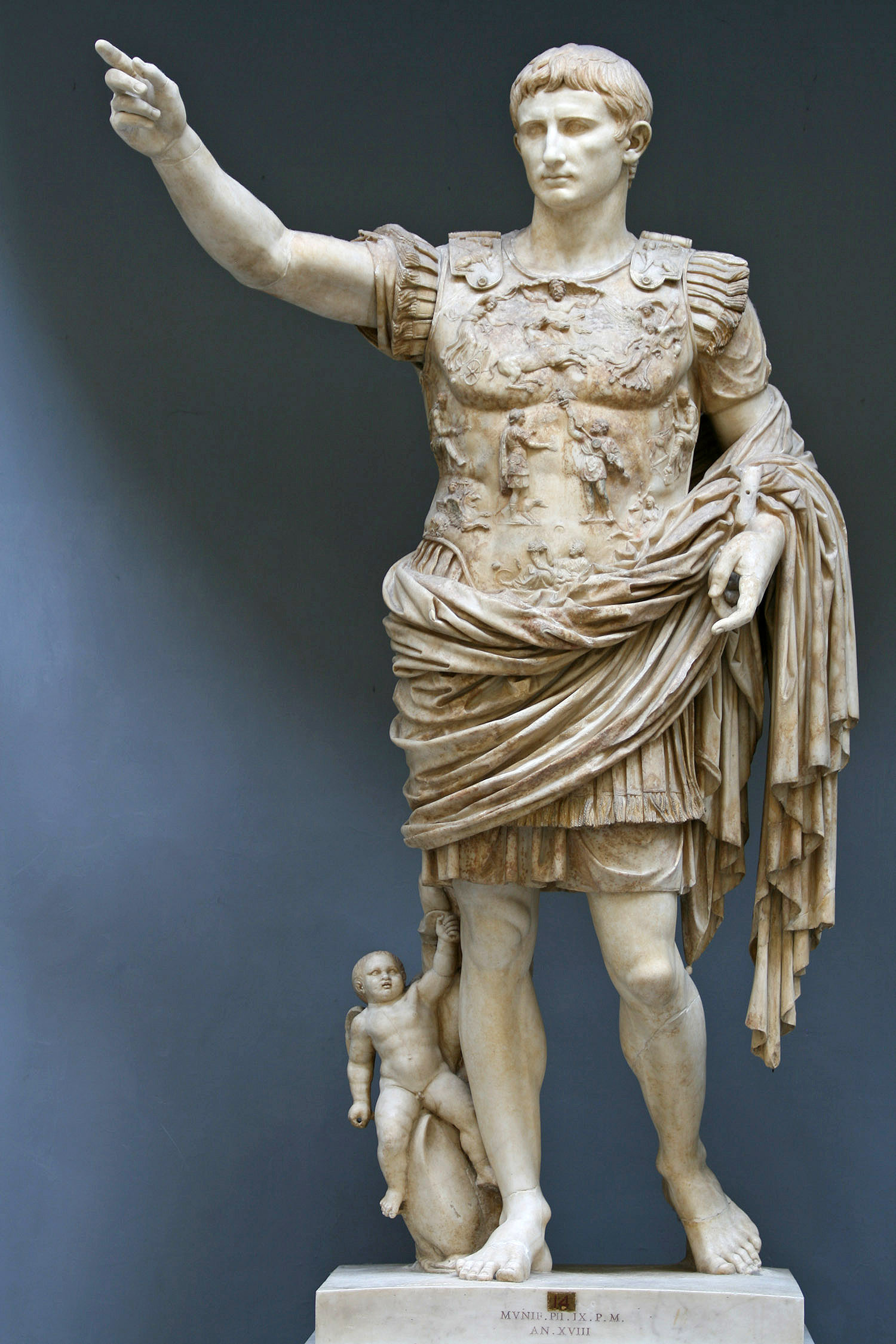
Statue of Augustus in military attire (paludamentum).

After the Battle of Actium in 31 BC, Augustus was compelled to decide not only how many legions should remain in service but also how many auxilia units needed to be permanently integrated into the army. Their units were subordinate to the legate of the legion while remaining distinctly separate from it.

The auxilia constituted the second fundamental component of the army. Given the degree of specialization of the legionary forces and their tactical limitations, it is clear that the auxilia were not merely additional forces but complementary to the legions (light or heavy cavalry, archers on foot or horseback, and "light infantry"). Many of these units likely did not exist before the Battle of Actium, but the names of some cavalry squadrons suggest they were recruited in Gaul by Caesar's officers.

==== Composition ====
Evidence of their existence dates back to the principate of Augustus, from an inscription found in Venafro in Samnium. They were distinguished from regular auxiliary cohorts by being mixed military units. They consisted of subunits of infantry and cavalry, mostly provincial (in the condition of peregrini), who aspired to obtain Roman citizenship after more than two decades of service. Although used by Caesar during the Gallic Wars, their organization, as it has been passed down to us, belongs to the process implemented by Augustus for the entire military system.

The cohortes equitatae had a structure similar to that of the cohortes peditatae for the infantry component and the alae for the cavalry component. They were initially commanded by a praefectus cohortis equitatae when they were still quingenariae and composed of peregrini, and later by a tribunus militum if milliariae or composed of cives Romani.

They consisted of 6 centuries of 80 infantrymen each (according to Josephus, 6 centuries of 100 infantrymen) and 4 turmae of cavalry, each with 32 cavalrymen, for a total of 480 infantrymen and 128 cavalrymen.

Starting from the Flavian dynasty, the first milliariae auxiliary units, consisting of approximately 1,000 soldiers, were introduced (created anew or by increasing the number of soldiers from a pre-existing quingenaria).

Type of auxiliary unit	Service	Commander	Subordinate	No. of subunits	Strength of subunit	Unit strength
Cohors equitata quingenaria	Infantry and cavalry	praefectus cohortis equitatae	Centurion (infantry) Decurion (cavalry)	6 centuriae 4 turmae	80 30	600 (480 infantry/120 cavalry) 720 (600 infantry/120 cavalry)
Cohors equitata milliaria	Infantry and cavalry	tribunus militum	Centurion (infantry) Decurion (cavalry)	10 centuriae 8 turmae	80 30	1,040 (800 infantry/240 cavalry)

According to G. L. Cheesman's thesis, the cavalrymen of a cohors equitata may have been used primarily for rapid movements (messengers), while typically fighting on foot, essentially forming mounted infantry. R. W. Davies, however, believes they constituted a genuine additional cavalry force, albeit secondary, compared to the regular alae. This second opinion seems to be supported by some passages from speeches delivered by Hadrian in Africa. The cohortes equitatae operated as a standalone body, not subordinate to an army or a legion. In large-scale wars, cavalry and infantry would fight with their respective units and not as independent forces within the cohors.

==== Internal hierarchy: officers, principales, and immunes ====
In the Augustan era, they were commanded by a native client king or prince, at least until after Tiberius, when they were then placed under a praefectus cohortis equitatae of the Equestrian order.

The troop body of a cohors equitata quingenaria, in addition to the officers (the praefectus cohortis, six centurions, and four decurions), was divided into three subcategories:

- The principales, or those non-commissioned officers capable of commanding small detachments or, if necessary, taking the place of company officers. These included the imaginifer (the bearer of the emperor's image) and probably a vexillarius (the bearer of the cohort's vexillum). Additionally:
  - For the infantry component: six signifer (standard-bearers for the six centuries composing the cohort), six optio singularium (aides to the centurions and the praefectus cohortis), and six tesserarii (one per century).
  - For the cavalry component: four duplicarii (rear-guard commanders, second-in-command of the turma) and four sesquiplicarii (third-in-command of the turma, with administrative and logistical duties).
- The immunes, or those infantrymen/cavalrymen who, although not even non-commissioned officers, were exempt from certain routine or heavy duties. These included a cornicularius (aide to the praefectus), some statores (guards for security, messengers), a librarius (clerk), an actuarius, and an unspecified number of beneficiarii (including the medicus ordinarius and possibly the capsarius). Additionally:
  - For the infantry component: six curator (accountants, one per century), some musicians to relay orders, such as the cornicen, the tubicen, and the bucinator.
  - For the cavalry component: one strator (trainer and horse caretaker), four signifer turmae (standard-bearers, one per turma), four custos armorum (arms caretakers, one per turma), and four additional curator (accountants, one per turma).
- All other infantrymen/cavalrymen not included in the first two categories.

According to Cheesman's calculations, in a cohors equitata quingenaria, apart from the praefectus cohortis equitatae, there were 6 centuriones and 4 decuriones (officers), 27 principales, and an unspecified number of immunes.

==== Light infantry and cavalry units ====
After the Augustan reform, the cohortes equitatae consisted of various types of cavalry and light infantry, as follows:

- Units of slingers (e.g., those from the Balearic Islands), typically equipped with a sling, to harass the enemy from a distance before direct infantry clashes; they played a role similar to that of the velites in the Republican era before the reform of Gaius Marius;
- Cavalry units such as the Numidian or Moorish, highly mobile, useful for striking the enemy's flanks and retreating quickly without losses; equipped with a small round shield (clipeus), a spatha sometimes reaching 90 cm (certainly longer than the gladius of the legionary), a lighter lancea (typically 1.8 meters long) and, in some cases, armor (lorica hamata or squamata);
- Sagittaria infantry and cavalry units, primarily composed of Eastern archers or Thracians on foot or horseback.

Thus, the cavalry forces of the cohors equitata served both as skirmishing cavalry (with throwing weapons such as arrows and javelins), useful for disrupting enemy troops during the approach to battle or during the battle itself, and as combat cavalry, though they were better suited to the former role and unlikely to form a strong shock cavalry force (with the long cavalry lance, the contus).

==== Service duration, pay, and discharge ====
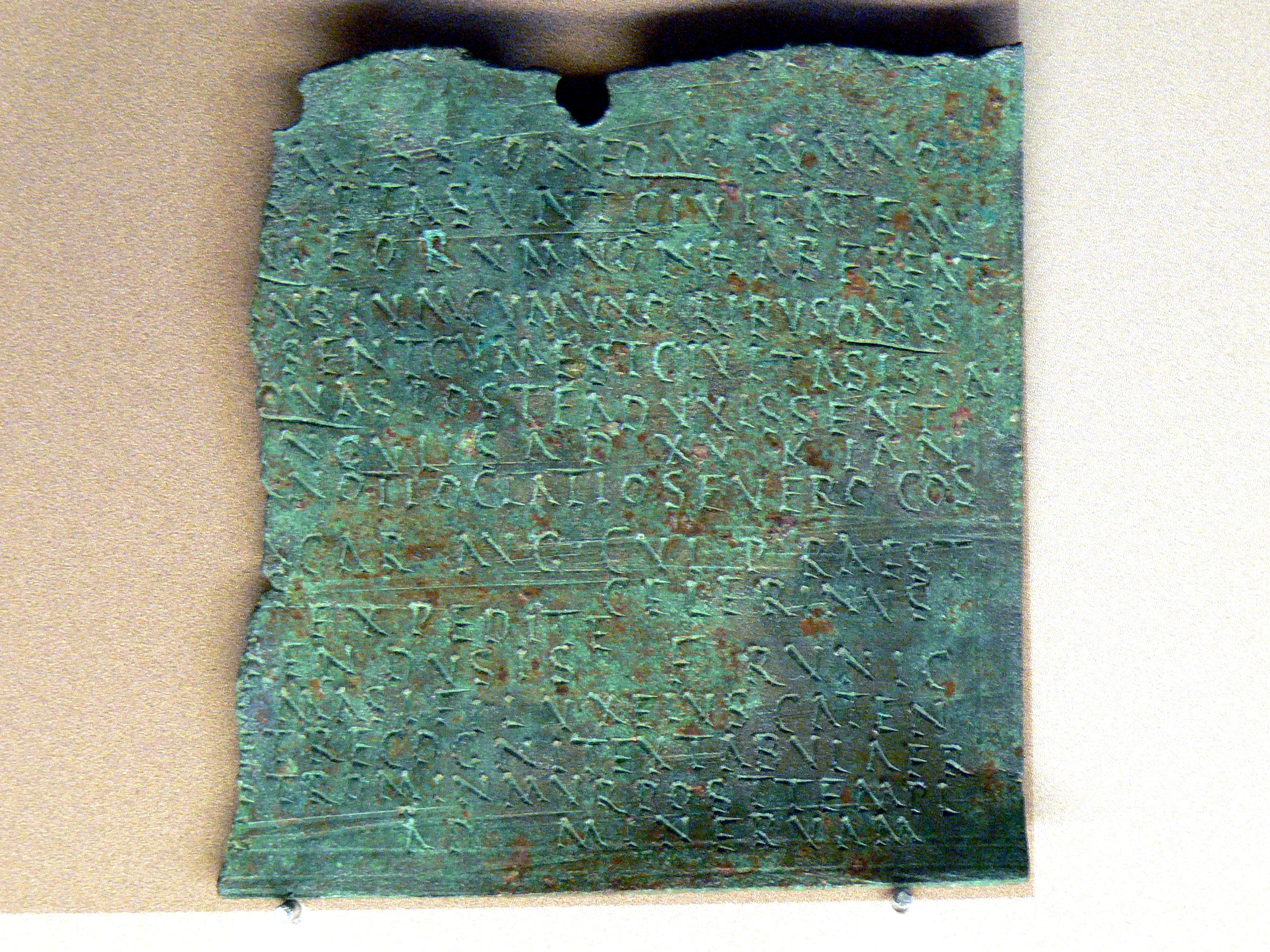
Diploma militaria of a typical cohors.

Auxiliary infantrymen and cavalrymen served for 25 years, at the end of which they received a diploma militare attesting to their discharge (honesta missio), along with a reward (in money or a plot of land, akin to a modern pension), Roman citizenship, and the right to marry. The pay (stipendium) for an infantryman of a cohors equitata was around 150 denarii (less than a legionary, who received 225 denarii annually), while for a cavalryman, it was less than that of a cavalryman in an ala but more than an infantryman of a cohors peditata (around 200 denarii). The pay was later increased by a quarter under Emperor Domitian, bringing the annual compensation for an infantryman to 200 denarii and for a cavalryman to 266 denarii.

== Bibliography ==
Ancient sources

- Appian, Guerra civile, IV.
- Caesar, De bello Gallico.
- Polybius, Histories, VI, 19–42.
- Vegetius, Epitoma rei militaris.

Modern historiographical sources

- Birley, Eric (1966). "Alae and cohortes milliariae". Corolla memoria Erich Swoboda Dedicata. Römische Forschungen in Niederösterreich V: 54–67.
- Cascarino, G. (2007). L'esercito romano. Armamento e organizzazione [The Roman Army. Armament and Organization, Vol. I - From Origins to the End of the Republic] (in Italian). Vol. I - Dalle origini alla fine della repubblica. Rimini: Il Cerchio.
- Cascarino, G. (2008). L'esercito romano. Armamento e organizzazione [The Roman Army. Armament and Organization, Vol. II - From Augustus to the Severans] (in Italian). Vol. II - Da Augusto ai Severi. Rimini: Il Cerchio.
- Cheesman, G.L. (1914). The Auxilia during the first two century A.D. Oxford: Oxford University Press.
- Connolly, P. (1998). Greece and Rome at War. London: Greenhill Books. ISBN 1-85367-303-X.
- Dixon, K.R.; Southern, P. (1992). The Roman Cavalry. London: Routledge.
- Field, N.; Hook, A. (2006). Roman Auxiliary Cavalryman AD 14–193. Oxford: Osprey Publishing. ISBN 1-84176-973-8.
- Goldsworthy, A.K. (2007). Storia completa dell'esercito romano [Complete History of the Roman Army] (in Italian). Modena: Logos. ISBN 978-88-7940-306-1.
- Keppie, L. (1998). The Making of the Roman Army, from Republic to Empire. London: Batsford.
- Le Bohec, Y. (2008). L'esercito romano da Augusto alla fine del III secolo [The Roman Army from Augustus to the End of the Third Century] (in Italian). Roma: Carocci. ISBN 978-88-430-4677-5.
- Le Bohec, Y. (2008). Armi e guerrieri di Roma antica. Da Diocleziano alla caduta dell'impero [Weapons and Warriors of Ancient Rome. From Diocletian to the Fall of the Empire] (in Italian). Roma: Carocci. ISBN 978-88-430-4677-5.
- Luttwak, E. (1991). La grande strategia dell'Impero romano [The Grand Strategy of the Roman Empire] (in Italian). Milano: Rizzoli.
- Macdowall, S. (1995). Late Roman Cavalryman, 236–565 AD. Osprey Publishing.
- Webster, G. (1998). The Roman Imperial Army of the First and Second Centuries A.D. Oklahoma: University of Oklahoma Press.
