= Veteran (Roman history) =

Military retirees in the Roman army

- Veterans were given land in the provinces at the end of the honesta missio, often in conjunction with the creation of new military-style colonies.
- Active: 753 BC - 476
- Country: Roman Kingdom; Roman Republic; Roman Empire
- Branch: Roman army
- Type: Experienced servicemen, former combatants
- Role: Military instructors Being recalled when needed
- Size: Variable according to the battle
- Part of: Roman legions Auxiliary troops
- Garrison/HQ: Roman provinces
- Patron: Mars
- Anniversaries: April 21
- Engagements: Roman battles

Commanders
- Notable commanders: Gaius Marius, Gaius Julius Caesar, Augustus

The term veteran in ancient Rome designated a soldier at the end of his service, in whatever corps he had served (praetorian or urban cohorts, legions, auxiliary army, navy). Length of service is a concept that evolves with the same history of organization of Rome's army and within it the figure of the miles. The veteran, initially, is a volunteer soldier; he arms himself at his own expense and remains in service for the duration of the military campaign for which he was recruited. Later with the organization of the army and the creation of a real social and legal subject, "the professional soldier," the duration of service would also be fixed according to the military corps to which he belonged.

== History ==
It is in 107 BC that a significant turning point happened: Gaius Marius carries out an extraordinary enlistment without regard to the census requirements of the recruits, enlisting proletarian volunteers. Thus a new, more direct relationship is established between soldier and general and, correspondingly, with the granting of rewards for veterans on discharge (an earlier occurrence took place with Scipio Africanus), the definition of a phenomenology with political implications and with repercussions on the territory and its organization.

Indeed, in the late republic, in the climate of civil wars, generals granted their soldiers, as a reward for service, plots of land often confiscated as acts of vindication against the opposing faction. It is worth recalling the concessions to veterans of Pompey, Caesar, Antony, and Octavian.

It was in the Augustan age, with a restructuring of the army, that a truly stable and permanent imperial army was established and consequently a profile of the miles and his legal status was defined.

Within the many changes enacted, it is to be recalled precisely the one that would set the military term of service at sixteen years in the praetorian cohorts, twenty years in the legions and twenty-five years in the navy (5 BC); Augustus also strove to ensure that the soldier would be adequately rewarded at discharge after spending most of his life in the army.

In 6 BC the princeps established the aerarium militare, a fund intended for the payment of premia to those who had been honorably discharged (honesta missio): (Note: In addition to the concept of honesta missio, there are also the concepts of ignominiosa missio, resulting from the commission of a crime, and causaria missio, the failure of a soldier's suitability for service.) the reward for soldiers could consist either of a plot of land (thereby regulating the procedure of the late republic) or a sum of money.

In the imperial age the practice of allocating land to veterans fell into disuse. It is worth recalling what Tacitus recounts in reference to the city of Taranto and the failure of the policy of veteran settlements, now conducted according to procedures different to those of the late republican age:

Non enim, ut olim universae legiones deducebantur cum tribunis et centurionibus et sui cuiusque ordinis militibus.
Now they no longer lead, as they once did, whole legions with tribunes and centurions and their soldiers of every order to establish colonies.

—Tacitus, Annals, XIV, 27,2; translated by A. Arici, Latin Classics, Utet, Turin, 1975, p. 793

The integration framework that resulted is dominated by desolation and existential loneliness:

Neque coniugis suscipiendis neque alendis liberis sueti orbas posteris domos relinquebant
Unaccustomed to contract marriages or raise children, they left their homes empty and without offspring

—Tacitus, Annals, XIV, 27.3; translated by A. Arici, Latin Classics, Utet, Turin, 1975, p. 793

Moreover, this framework has been attested by epigraphic data, particularly seven epigraphs from Taranto relating to veterans from the area of Southern Italy, dating from the period between the 1st and 3rd centuries CE. Primarily, the Taranto settlement is the richest in evidence, as the related documentation is both literary and epigraphic in nature. The epitaphs of Taranto have no dedicators except for two attestations: the epitaph of a wife to her husband and that of a heres. Two epitaphs were found at Luceria: one of a heres and one of the veteran's friend.

It was to become established with the imperial age, however, a typology of privileges due to the veteran: he acquired rights including the Ius Conubii, which allowed him to marry indigenous women (a practice forbidden during military service), immunity from public office and from taxation on property owned upon discharge. The veteran was allowed to marry women from different social strata, such as freedwomen, ingenui women, or women from newly Romanized families.

During the provincial dynasty, Emperor Hadrian made the awkward distinction between honestiores and humiliores, and among the honestiores we find the veterans, who had obtained this title as a reward.

Septimius Severus, in order to operationalize the discharged soldiers, entrusted them with uncultivated and abandoned lands to improve the economy of the campaigns and allow them to create for themselves a new modus vivendi within society.

In fact, the Severans, through interventions in the territorial rearrangement of the Italic campaigns, allowed for a repopulation of these lands, facilitating their purchase through favorable prices or even granting them free of charge so that veterans could be induced to opt for settlement in certain areas.

Obviously, this political conduct of the Severans was aimed at protecting the territories of the empire and thus provided for the militarization of the area.

In Late Antiquity, under the emperor Constantine I the practice of allotting land to veterans, on which no taxes were levied, returned, so as to encourage more and more enlistment.

This practice benefited Rome, as these former soldiers contributed to the cultivation of uncultivated or abandoned lands; moreover, upon their death these lands passed to their children, returning to being subject to taxation.

Under Constantine, Constantius II and Valentinian I, veterans devoted themselves not only to the cultivation of land but also to trade and transportation (being owners of ships). In fact, these emperors incentivized through reforms all these social reintegration activities to prevent discharged soldiers from falling into a state of inopia (total lack of livelihood). For example, Valentinian I in 365 issued a measure that went to regulate the way in which veterans stayed in private lands: it could in fact happen that the original master (dominus) claimed those same lands that had belonged to him and were now profitable again. It is also possible to see some differences in the land-grant policy of Constantine and Valentinian; Constantine granted land to veterans without domicile or not engaged in any negotium, while Valentinian I granted land indiscriminately to all those who desired a homeland.

In the area of trade, since there was a revaluation of this activity, two reforms are mentioned: one by Constantine in 326 and the other by Valentinian in 366.

== Quotations in ancient sources ==
An example of veterans is mentioned by Cassius Dio during the last phase of the Third Mithridatic War (65-64 B.C.E.) when Pompey decided to found a city, called Nicopolis, at the place where the battle of the Lycus, in which he had defeated Mithridates, took place. Here he sent as inhabitants those soldiers who were still wounded or advanced in age: that is, the veterans.

Gaius Julius Caesar, contrary to what had been done by many of his predecessors who provided troops with occasional donations, found it necessary to give continuity to the service that the soldiers provided, instituting for discharge the right to a reward in land, in accordance with the custom that until then had been at the total discretion of the commander alone. Augustus, on the other hand, was responsible for the introduction of a professional army that remained in service for no less than sixteen years for legionaries, increased to twenty years in 5 CE (as had been the case since the time of Polybius, in the event of a major crisis), and twenty to twenty-five years for auxiliary troops. This period of service could be followed by further years among the "reserves" of veterans, 500 in number per legion placed under the command of a curator veteranorum.

At the beginning of the Principate, it is known from Augustus himself, through his Res Gestae, that to the 300,000 soldiers sent on leave (veterans), donations were distributed from the spoils of war:

3. [...] Millia civium Romanorum sub sacramento meo fuerunt circiter quingenta. Ex quibus deduxi in colonias aut remisi in municipia sua stipendis emeritis millia aliquanto plura quam trecenta et iis omnibus agros adsignavi aut pecuniam pro praemis militiae dedi. [...]
3. [...] There are almost five hundred thousand Roman citizens in arms under my command; of whom I sent more than three hundred thousand to colonies or back to their municipia, having completed their military service; and to them (all) I allotted land or gave money as a reward for service. [...]
15. [...] colon[i]s militum meorum consul quintum ex manibiis viritim millia nummum singula dedi. acceperunt id triumphale congiarium in colonis hominum circiter centum et viginti millia....
15. [...] to the colonists who had been my soldiers, when I was consul for the fifth time, I distributed per head a thousand nummi from the sale of the spoils of war; in the colonies about a hundred and twenty thousand men received this congiarium of the triumph.

Land was purchased for 260,000 sesterces to discharge veterans of the civil wars, and another 400,000 sesterces for subsequent discharges in the years 7-2 BC:

16. Pecuniam [pr]o agris, quos in consulatu meo quarto et postea consulibus M. Cr[a]ssao et Cn. Lentulo augure adsignavi militibus, soliv municipis. Ea [s]u[mma s]estertium circiter sexsiens milliens fuit, quam [p]ro Italicis praedis numeravi. et ci[r]citer bis mill[ie]ns et sescentiens, quod pro agris provincialibus soliv. Id primus et [s]olus omnium, qui [d]eduxerunt colonias militum in Italia aut in provincis, ad memoriam aetatis meae feci. Et postea Ti. Nerone et Cn. Pisone consulibus, et D.Laelio cos., et C. Calvisio et L. Pasieno consulibus, et L. Le[nt]ulo et M. Messalla consulibus, et L.Caninio et Q. Fabricio co[s.], milit[i]bus, quos emeriteis stipendis in sua municipi[a dedux]i, praem[i]a numerato persolvi. ~ quam in rem sestertium q[uater m]illiens cir[cite]r impendi.
I paid to the municipia the compensation for the land which, during my fourth consulship (Note: In 30 BC, after the Battle of Actium.) and then under the consulship of Marcus Crassus and Gnaeus Cornelius Lentulus Augur, I assigned to the soldiers. And the sum, which I paid in cash, for the Italic properties amounted to about six hundred million sesterces, and it was about two hundred and sixty million what I paid for the provincial lands. And in memory of my time I performed this act first and alone among all those who founded colonies of soldiers in Italy or in the provinces. And then under the consulship of Tiberius and Gnaeus Calpurnius Piso and again under the consulship of Gaius Antistius, Decimus Lelius, Gnaeus Calvisius, Lucius Pasienus, Lucius Lentulus, Marcus Messalla, Lucius Caninius and Quintus Fabricius (Note: Consular pairs indicate the years 7, 6, 4, 3, and 2 BCE.) to the soldiers whom, having finished their military service, I sent back to their municipia, I paid cash premiums, and for this transaction I spent about four hundred million sesterces."

In the year 5 AD, military service was increased to 20 years:

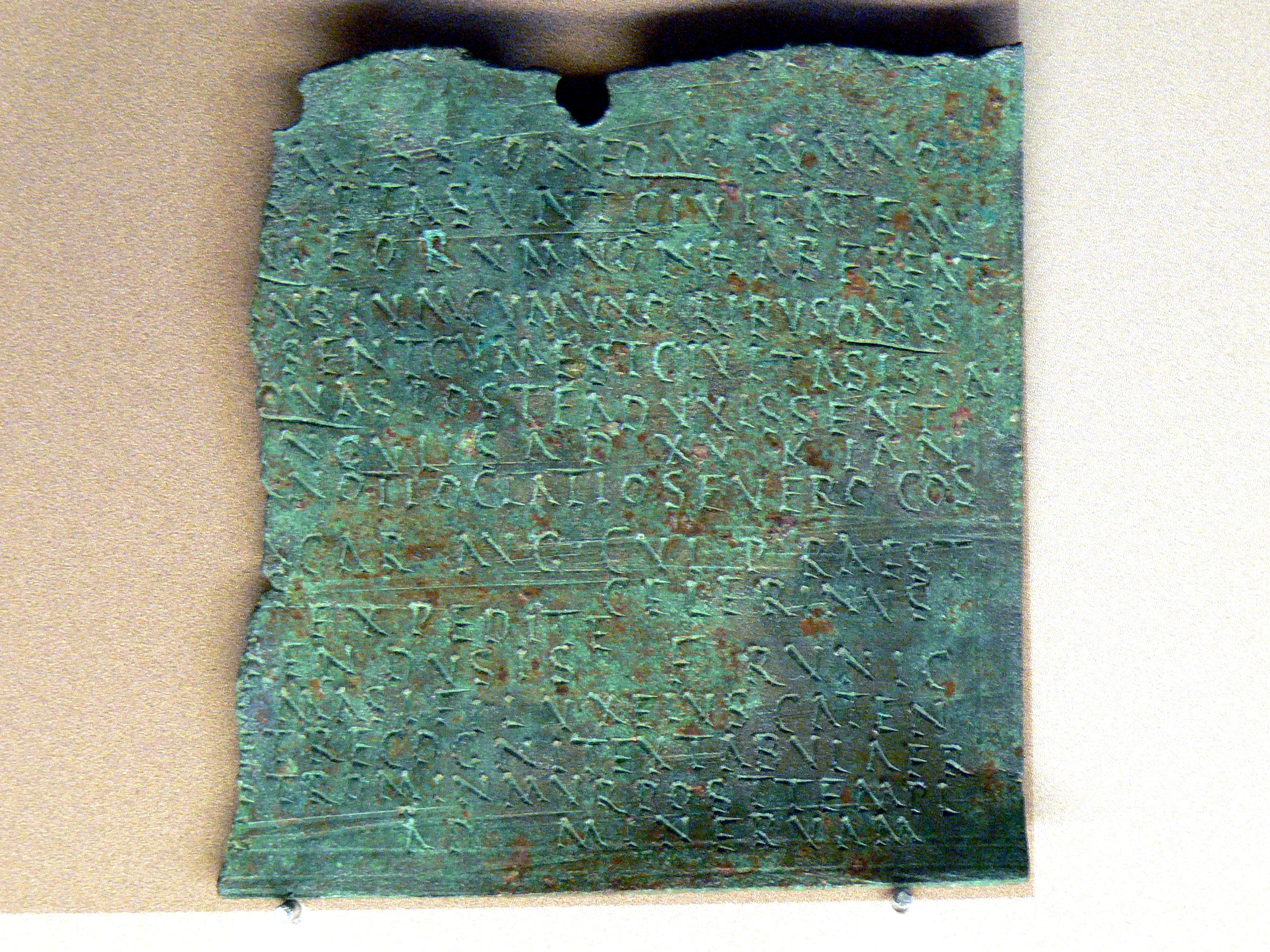
Example of a military diploma written upon the discharge of a miles of cohors V Bracaraugustanorum, in 160 AD, from Quntana, today's Künzing.

17. [...] Et M. Lepido et L. Ar[r]untio cos. in aerarium militare, quod ex consilio n[eo] co[ns]titutum est, ex [q]uo praemia darentur militibus, qui vicena [aut plu]ra sti[pendi]a emeruissent — HS milliens et septing[e]nti[ens ex pa]t[rim]onio [m]eo detuli.
"17. [...] And under the consulship of Marcus Lepidus and Lucius Arruntius I transferred the military treasury, (Note: The establishment of the military treasury occurred in 6 AD.) which was established at my suggestion so that from it would be taken the rewards to be given to soldiers who had completed twenty or more years of service, (Note: In 5 CE Augustus set the new length of military service: 16 years for praetorians and 20 years for legionaries. But the service was often extended, as Augustus himself acknowledged, to 30 or 40 years.) one hundred and seventy million sesterces by taking them from my estate."

Numerous colonies of veterans were founded in all the Imperial provinces:

28. Colonias in Africa Sicilia Macedonia utraque Hispania Achai[a] Asia S[y]ria Gallia Narbonensi Pi[si]dia militum deduxi. Italia autem XXVIII [colo]nias, quae vivo me celeberrimae et frequentissimae fuerunt, me auctore deductas habet.
"28. I founded colonies of soldiers in Africa, in Sicilia, in Macedonia, in both Spains, in Achaia, in Asia, in Syria, in Gallia Narbonensis, in Pisidia. Italy then possesses, founded by my will, twenty-eight colonies, which during my lifetime were very prosperous and populous." (Note: Notable examples include Trieste, Aosta and Turin.)

== See also ==
- Auxilia
- Roman army
- Pay (Roman army)

== Bibliography ==
- Pani, M.; Todisco, E. (2008). Storia romana Dalle origini alla tarda antichità. Bari.
- Keppie, l. (1983). Colonisation and Veteran settlement in Italy in the first century. London.
- Pani, M.; Todisco, E. (2008). Società e istituzioni di Roma antica. Bari.
- Forni, G. (1992). Esercito e marina di Roma antica. Stuttgart.
- Todisco, E. (1999). I veterani in Italia in età imperiale. Bari.
- Le Bohec, Y. (1989). La troisième légion Augustée. Paris.
- Le Bohec, Y. (1989). Les unités auxiliaires de l'armée romaine. Paris.
- Le Bohec, Y. (1989). Inscriptions inédites ou corrigées concervant l'armée romaine d'Afrique. Paris.
- Le Bohec, Y. (1992). L'esercito romano. Le armi imperiali da Augusto a Caracalla. Rome.
- Le Bohec, Y. (1994). L'armée et l'organisation de l'espace urbain, in L'africa romana, Atti del X Convegno di studio. Sassari.
- Classici latini. Turin. 1975.
- Les légions de Rome sous le Haut-Empire. 2000.
- L'armée romaine de Dioclétien à Valentinien I. Lyon. 2004.
- Milan, Alessandro (1993). Le forze armate nella storia di Roma Antica. Rome.
