= Classiarius =

Sailors in the Roman army

Classiarii
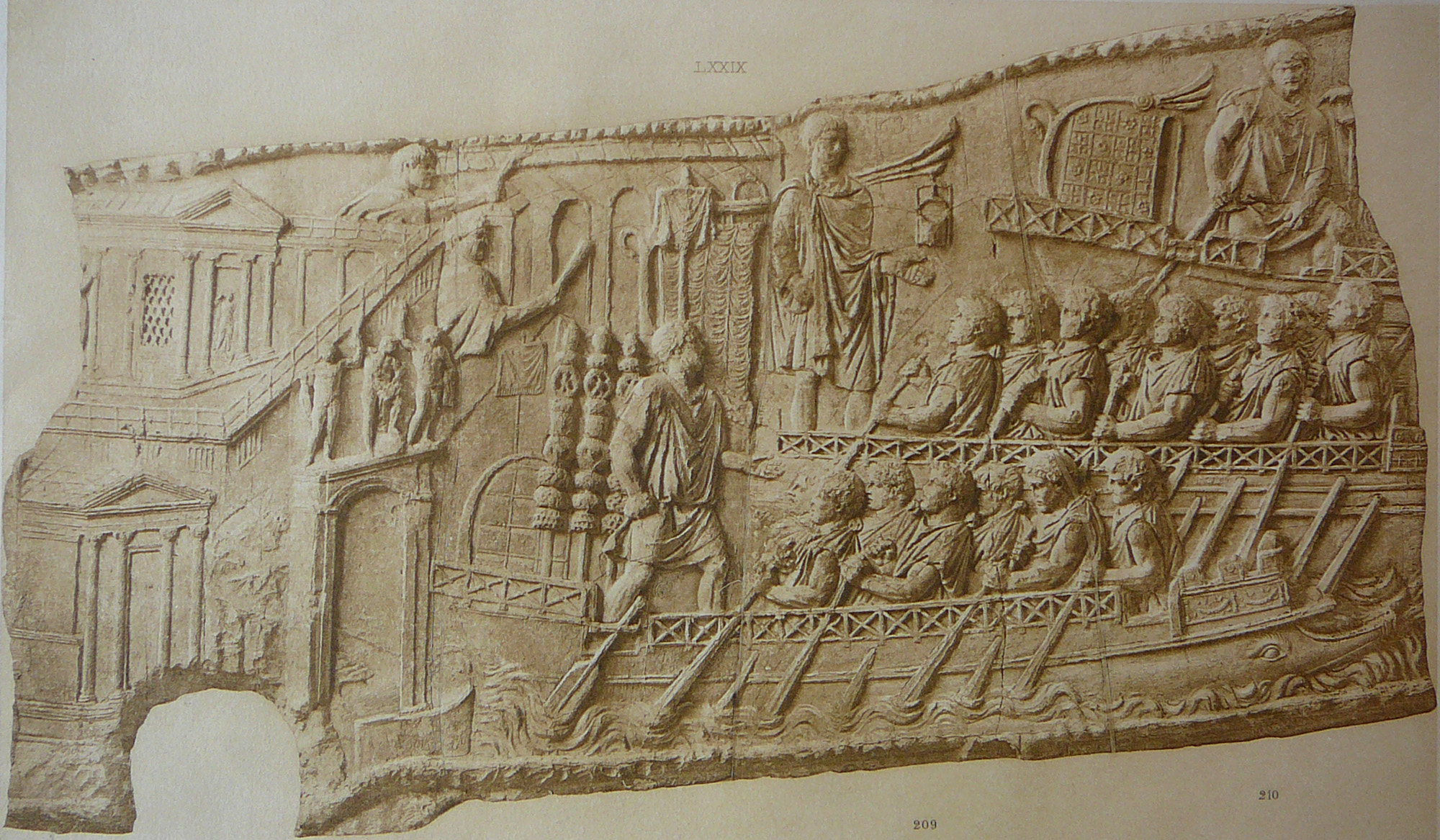
- Cast of the Trajan's Column during the conquest of Dacia, depicting some Classiarii on Roman warships (Column, panel no.58 according to Cichorius).
- Active: 31 BC – 476 AD
- Country: Ancient Rome
- Branch: Roman army
- Type: Seamen
- Role: Maneuvering ships
- Garrison/HQ: Miseno (Classis Misenensis), Classe (Classis Ravennatis), Forum Iulii (Gallia Narbonensis), Gesoriacum (Britannia), Castra Vetera - Colonia Claudia Ara Agrippinensium (Germania), Aquincum (Classis Pannonica), Sexaginta Prista-Noviodunum (Classis Flavia Moesica), Trapezus (Classis Pontica), Alexandria (Classis Alexandrina).
- Patron: Neptune
- Engagements: List of Roman external wars and battles
- Decorations: Dona militaria

Commanders
- Current commander: Praefectus classis

Classiarii (singular: Classiarius; from Latin classis "fleet") referred to all military personnel (from the highest rank of praefectus classis to the simplest rank of miles classiarius) and personnel assigned to the maneuvering of ships (e.g., velarii or remiges) or their construction/maintenance (e.g., fabri navales), as part of the Roman navy, an integral part of the Roman army.

== History ==
- Augustus, after the Battle of Actium, reformed the army and navy, divided into praetoriae squadrons at Miseno, Ravenna (port of Classe) and initially at Forum Iulii, as well as provinciales in Syria, Egypt, along the Rhine, Danube and Sava.
- Claudius increased the number of free and provincial citizens employed among the classiarii sailors, in contrast to what had happened in Augustus' time, where the majority were slaves and/or freedmen. The fleet now became part of the regular auxilia, where sailors received citizenship upon discharge (honesta missio) after twenty-six years of service, while their sons were allowed to serve in the legions.
- Nero created a new fleet in the Pontus Euxinus (now Black Sea), the Classis Pontica, also using ships that had belonged to the former kingdom of Thrace, annexed in 46 by Claudius.
- Under Vespasian's rule, Suetonius tells of a curious episode:

Having asked the sailors for something (allowance) for their shoes, since they had to walk frequently from Ostia and Pozzuoli to Rome, Vespasian did not think it right not to have given them an answer, so he added that the order was to go barefoot, so much so that it is still done that way today [Suetonius' time].

— Suetonius, Life of Vespasian, 8.

- Galba carried out the enlistment of the I Adiutrix legions (whose personnel consisted of men who had served in the Italic fleets of Miseno and Ravenna).
- Under the rule of Antoninus Pius, the careers of fleet officers were still restricted to the navy alone.
- In the third century, classiarii officers were equated with those of the legion as a condition of stipendium, and thus with the possibility of being transferred and making a career in the legions themselves.

== Hierarchical structure and organization ==
The core of a naval crew was formed by the oarsmen (in Latin remiges, sing. remex; in Greek eretai, sing. eretēs). Contrary to popular belief, the Roman navy, as well as that of ancient times in general, based its existence on oarsmen of free status, not on slaves, who on the contrary were used only in cases of extreme necessity, so much so that they were then made free prematurely. During the Roman Empire, provincials, not yet Roman citizens but freeborn (peregrini) from Greece, Phoenicia, Syria and Egypt, formed the main core of fleet crews.

During the Republican period, the command of the fleet was entrusted to a magistrate or promagistrate, normally of consular or praetorian rank. During the Punic Wars, for example, one consul commanded the fleet, while the other commanded the land army. In later wars waged in the East, praetors assumed command of the fleet. However, since these men had political appointments, the actual management of fleets or naval squadrons was entrusted to their subordinates, the certainly more experienced legati. It was therefore during the Punic Wars that the figure of the praefectus classis appeared for the first time.

During the early principate, a ship's crew, beyond its size, was nevertheless organized as a centuria. They were framed in fact as soldiers (miles classiarii), maneuverers (remiges and velarii), construction workers (fabri navales) and other duties. The personnel of the fleet were considered inferior, not only to those of the legions, but also to those of the auxiliary troops.

As in the Roman army, each ship, organized in centuria, was placed under the command of a centurio classiarius, who had in the optio his most trusted subordinate. The beneficiarius, on the other hand, lent a hand at the administrative level. Among the crew there were a certain number of both principales and immunes, exactly as was the case in the auxiliary troops.

Regarding high command, on the other hand, during the imperial period, with Augustus the praefectus classis became procurator Augusti, at the head of each permanent fleet. These posts were initially filled by those who belonged to the equestrian order, or beginning with Claudius, by his freedmen, thus ensuring direct imperial control over the various fleets. With the Flavian dynasty, the status of praefectus was entrusted only to knights with military experience, who had made a career in the equestrian militiae. Again, the prefect, though endowed with military experience, was nevertheless a politician with little naval knowledge, so much so that he relied on subordinates.

Great expertise and responsibility was required of the classiarii, particularly of some key figures:

- the gubernator (helmsman) had to know not only the harbors, but also the rocks, shoals or sandbars present along the shipping route. Great expertise was required of the same during naval clashes, when the helmsman was of paramount importance in finding the best course to strike the opposing ships or to avoid being sunk by the enemy.
- Navarchs (ship commanders) were required to have great attention and skill in commanding the ships' crews.
- Courage and great physical strength was required of oarsmen, as was necessary during a naval battle, when on the calm sea without a breath of wind, everything was entrusted to the thrust of the oars, in order to strike the opponents with the rostrums and, in turn, avoid being struck and sunk.

Finally, it is estimated that there were about 40,000 to 50,000 classiarii during the Early Roman Empire, organized according to the following hierarchical structure:

- Commandery:
  - praefectus classis, or fleet commander, where praefectus classis Misenensis represented the most coveted command post, along with praefectus classis Ravennatis, compared to provincial ones;
  - subpraefectus classis
- Officers:
  - navarchus princeps, commander of several squadrons (dozens of ships), equivalent in the Roman legion to primus pilus;
  - navarchus, commander of a detachment of the mother-fleet (or at any rate a ship), usually consisting of ten ships; he was in charge of training helmsmen, oarsmen and soldiers;
  - trierarchus, commander of a trireme;
  - centurio classiarius, commander of a ship with one hundred miles classiarii (after 70), also equated to a regular "land" centurion in function of his military career (cursus honorum);
- sub-officers (principales, positions placed under the centurion, thus exempt from normal routine duties or services):
  - Dupicarii (with pay equal to twice that of the simple miles classiarius):
    - Optio: the vice-centurion, one per centuria, who closed the deployment of this unit;
    - Signifer or vexillifer: standard-bearer (signa);
  - sesquiplicarius (with pay equal to one and a half times that of the simple miles classiarius):
    - the cornicen and tubicen, players of wind instruments who gave orders during maneuvers or battles;
    - the beneficiarius with administrative duties;
- Troop corps:
  - immunes soldiers:
    - the custos armorum, in charge of weapons;
    - the ballistarius and sagittarius, troops specializing in throwing blunt weapons;
    - medicus, ship's doctor;
  - non-immunes:
    - miles classiarius, simple soldier;
    - nauta (sail attendant);
    - remex (oarsman);

Other important roles on ships, probably falling within the group of immunes were, according to an inscription found at Kos during the First Mithridatic War:

- the gubernator (kybernētēs in Greek), the stern helmsman;
- the celeusta (keleustēs in Greek), who supervised the oarsmen;
- the proreta (prōreus in Greek), who watched from the bow of the ship for the right direction, also to avoid possible obstacles;
- pentacontarchos, a young officer.

== Clothing, weapons and armor ==
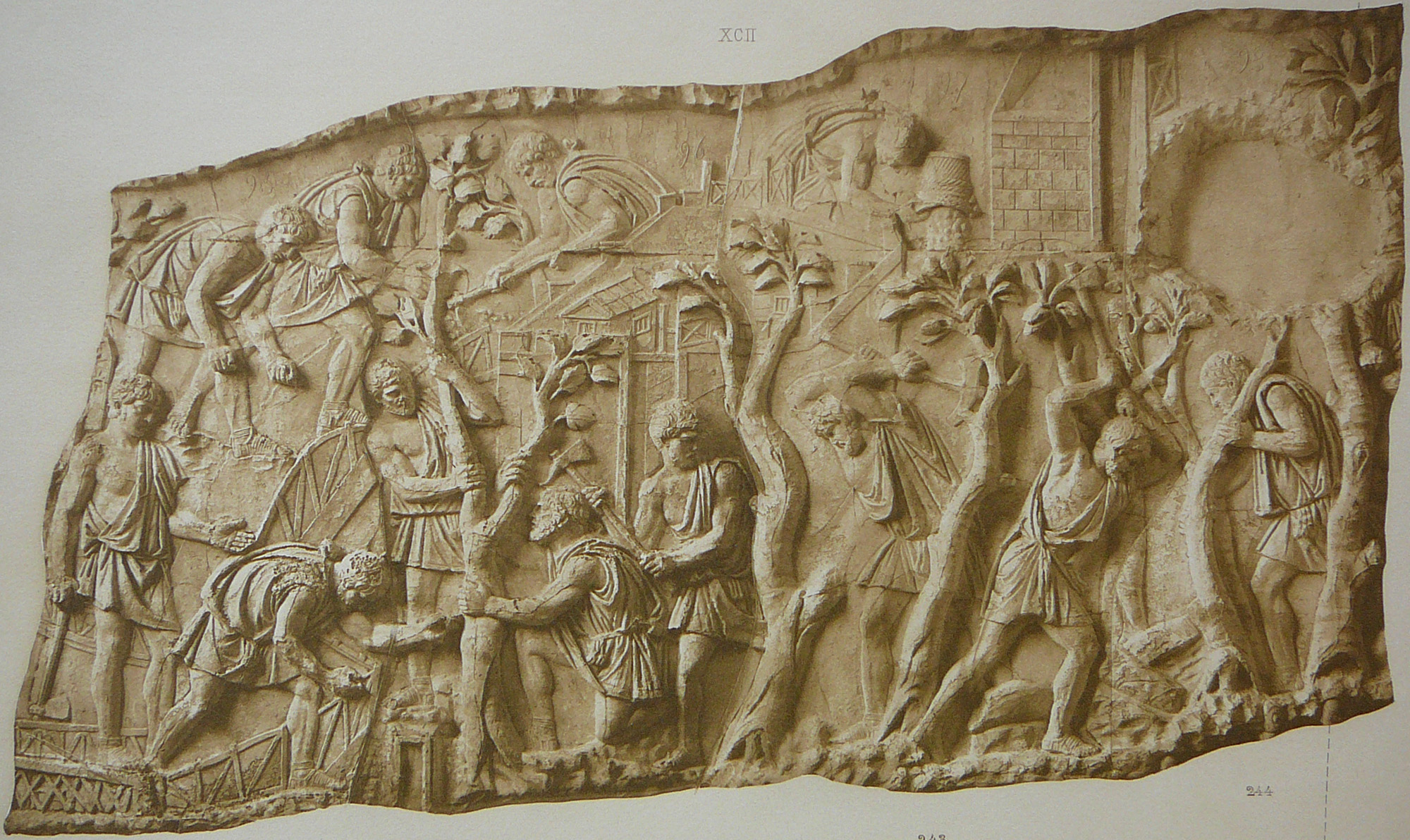
Classiarii helping ground troops in building bridges, roads and fortifications (Trajan's Column, scene 67).

In order to prevent the boats from being recognized when exploring, they were dyed blue (the color of the sea waves), along with their ropes and sails, to better camouflage themselves. The same thing applied to the crew of the classiarii, who wore blue uniforms so that they could remain hidden, not only at night but also during the day.

== Length of service and pay ==
Fleet personnel (Classiarii) were divided into two groups: sailors and soldiers. Service lasted 26 years (as opposed to 20 for the legionaries and 25 for the auxilia). From the third century it was increased to 28 years of service. Upon discharge (Honesta missio) sailors were given a severance pay, land and usually also granted citizenship, as they were in the status of peregrini at the time of enlistment. Marriage, on the other hand, was allowed to them only at the end of permanent active service.

There was a substantial difference in stipendium between the high ranks of command: the prefects of the two praetoriae fleets (Misenensis and Ravennatis), were classified as procuratores ducenarii, i.e., they earned 200,000 sesterces annually; the prefect of the Classis Germanica, Classis Britannica, and later the Classis Pontica, on the other hand, were procuratores centenarii (earning 100,000 sesterces), while the other prefects were also called procuratores sexagenarii (i.e., they earned 60,000 sesterces).

== Classiarii employed in the legions and auxiliary troops ==
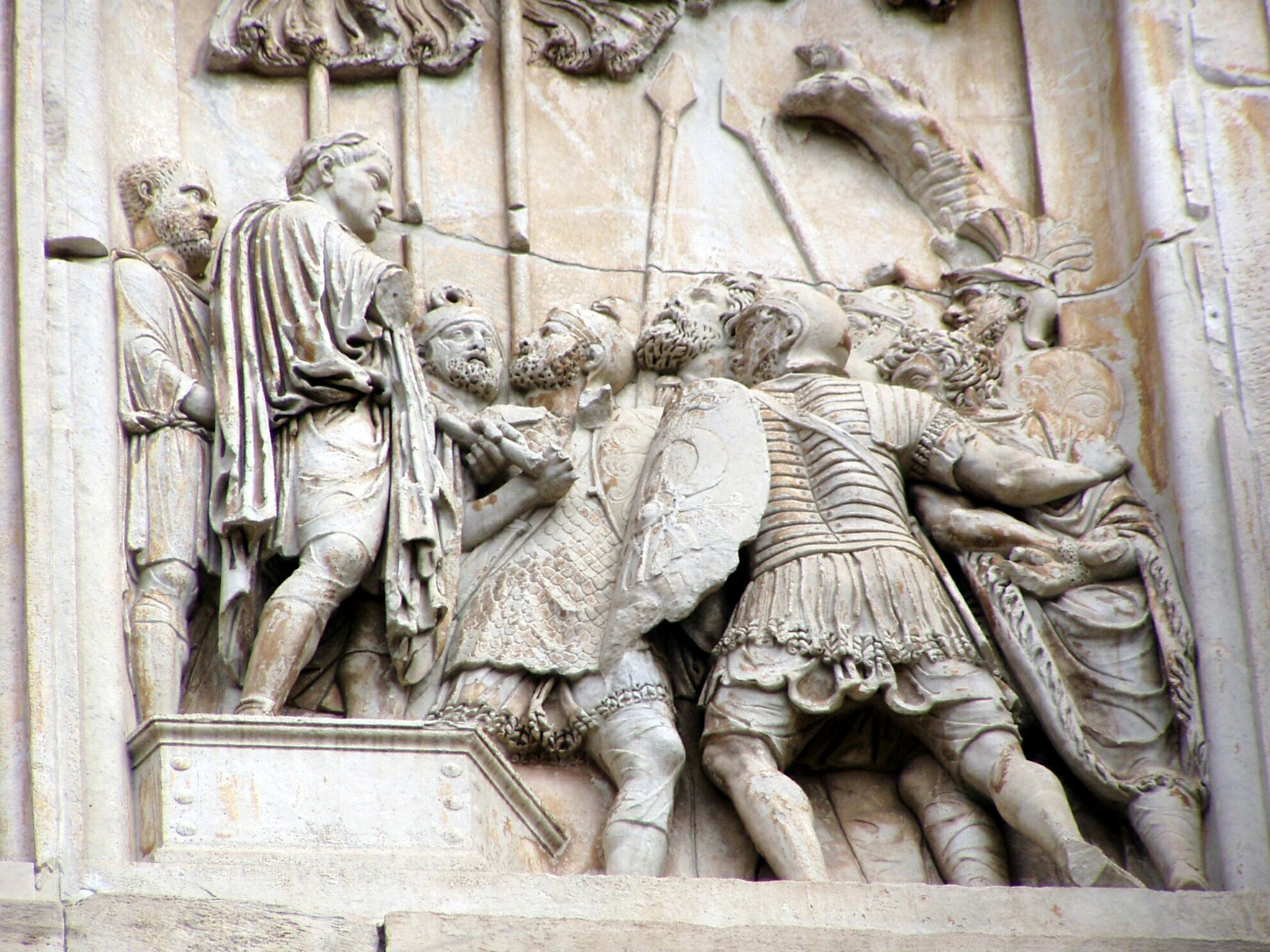
The shield depicted in this frieze (from the time of Marcus Aurelius), now on the Arch of Constantine, belonged to one of the two Adiutrix legions of classiarii.

A Legio XVII Classica, i.e., naval, probably distinct from one under Octavian that bore the same numbering, was part of Mark Antony's army and had to disappear after his defeat at Actium. A similar fate befell the Legio XXX Classica, which appears to have been stationed in Asia in late Republican times.

Two more "naval" legions were, therefore, enlisted under Nero in 68 (the I Adiutrix from the classis Misenensis), as well as one of its "twins" in 69 by Vespasian (the II Adiutrix Pia Fidelis).

== See also ==
- Roman navy
- Roman army
- Roman legion
- Cursus honorum

== Bibliography ==
- Ammianus Marcellinus. The History.
- Appian. Illyrian Wars. Archived from the original on October 22, 2017.
- Cassius Dio. Roman History. Vol. XII. pp. 51–52.
- Herodian. History of the Roman Empire since the Death of Marcus Aurelius. Vol. VI–VIII. Archived from the original on October 31, 2012.
- Eutropius. Breviarium historiae romanae. Vol. IX.
- Fasti triumphales AE 1930, 60.
- Florus. Epitoma de Tito Livio bellorum omnium annorum DCC. Vol. I.
- Jordanes. Getica. Archived from the original on 2008-02-13.
- Livy. Ab Urbe condita libri.
- Livy. Periochae.
- Polybius. The Histories.
- Strabo. The Geography. Vol. VIII.
- Suetonius. De vita Caesarum libri VIII.
- Tacitus. Annales.
- Tacitus. Historiae.
- Vegetius. Epitoma rei militaris.
- Velleius Paterculus. Historiae Romanae ad M. Vinicium libri duo.
- Carro, Domenico (December 2002). "Classica, appendici marittime". Supplemento alla Rivista Marittima.
- Cascarino, Giuseppe (2008). L'esercito romano. Armamento e organizzazione, Vol. II - Da Augusto ai Severi. Rimini: Il Cerchio.
- Cascarino, Giuseppe; Sansilvestri, Carlo (2009). L'esercito romano. Armamento e organizzazione, Vol. III - Dal III secolo alla fine dell'Impero d'Occidente. Rimini: Il Cerchio.
- Casson, Lionel (1991). The Ancient Mariners: Seafarers and Sea Fighters of the Mediterranean in Ancient Times. Princeton University Press. ISBN 0691014779.
- Casson, Lionel (1995). Ships and Seamanship in the Ancient World. Johns Hopkins University Press.
- Connolly, Peter (1976). L'esercito romano. Milano: Mondadori.
- Connolly, Peter (1998). Greece and Rome at war. Londra: Greenhill Books.
- Goldsworthy, Adrian (2000). The Fall of Carthage: The Punic Wars 265–146 BC. Cassell. ISBN 0-304-36642-0.
- J. Klein, M. (1998). "Traiano e Magonza. La capitale della provincia della Germania superior". In Arbore Popescu, Grigore (ed.). Traiano ai confini dell'Impero. Milan: Electa Mondadori. ISBN 88-435-6676-8.
- Le Bohec, Yann (1993). L'esercito romano. Le armi imperiali da Augusto alla fine del III secolo. Roma: Carocci.
- Le Bohec, Yann (2008). Armi e guerrieri di Roma antica. Da Diocleziano alla caduta dell'impero. Roma: Carocci.
- Meijer, Fik (1986). A History of Seafaring in the Classical World. Routledge. ISBN 978-0-7099-3565-0.
- Milan, Alessandro (1993). Le forze armate nella storia di Roma Antica. Roma: Jouvence.
- Potter, David (2004). "The Roman Army and Navy". In I. Flower, Harriet (ed.). The Cambridge Companion to the Roman Republic. Cambridge University Press. pp. 66–88. ISBN 978-0-521-00390-2.
- Rankov, Boris (1995). "Fleets of the Early Roman Empire, 31 BC–AD 324". In Morrison, John S.; Gardiner, Robert (eds.). The Age of the Galley: Mediterranean Oared Vessels Since Pre-Classical Times. London: Conway Maritime Press. pp. 78–85. ISBN 0-85177-554-3.
- Reddé, Michael (1986). Mare nostrum. Paris: École Française de Rome.
- Saddington, D. B. (2007). "Classes. The Evolution of the Roman Imperial Fleets". In Erdkamp, Paul (ed.). A Companion to the Roman Army. Blackwell Publishing Ltd. ISBN 978-1-4051-2153-8.
- Starr, Chester G. (1960). The Roman Imperial Navy: 31 B.C.-A.D. 324 (2nd ed.). Cornell University Press.
- Starr, Chester G. (1989). The Influence of Sea Power on Ancient History. Oxford University Press US.
- Webster, Graham; Elton, Hugh (1998). The Roman Imperial Army of the First and Second Centuries A.D. University of Oklahoma Press. ISBN 0-8061-3000-8.
- Wesch-Klein, Gabriele (1998). Soziale Aspekte des römischen Heerwesens in der Kaiserzeit. Franz Steiner Verlag.
