= Classis Pontica =

Provincial naval fleet of Ancient Rome

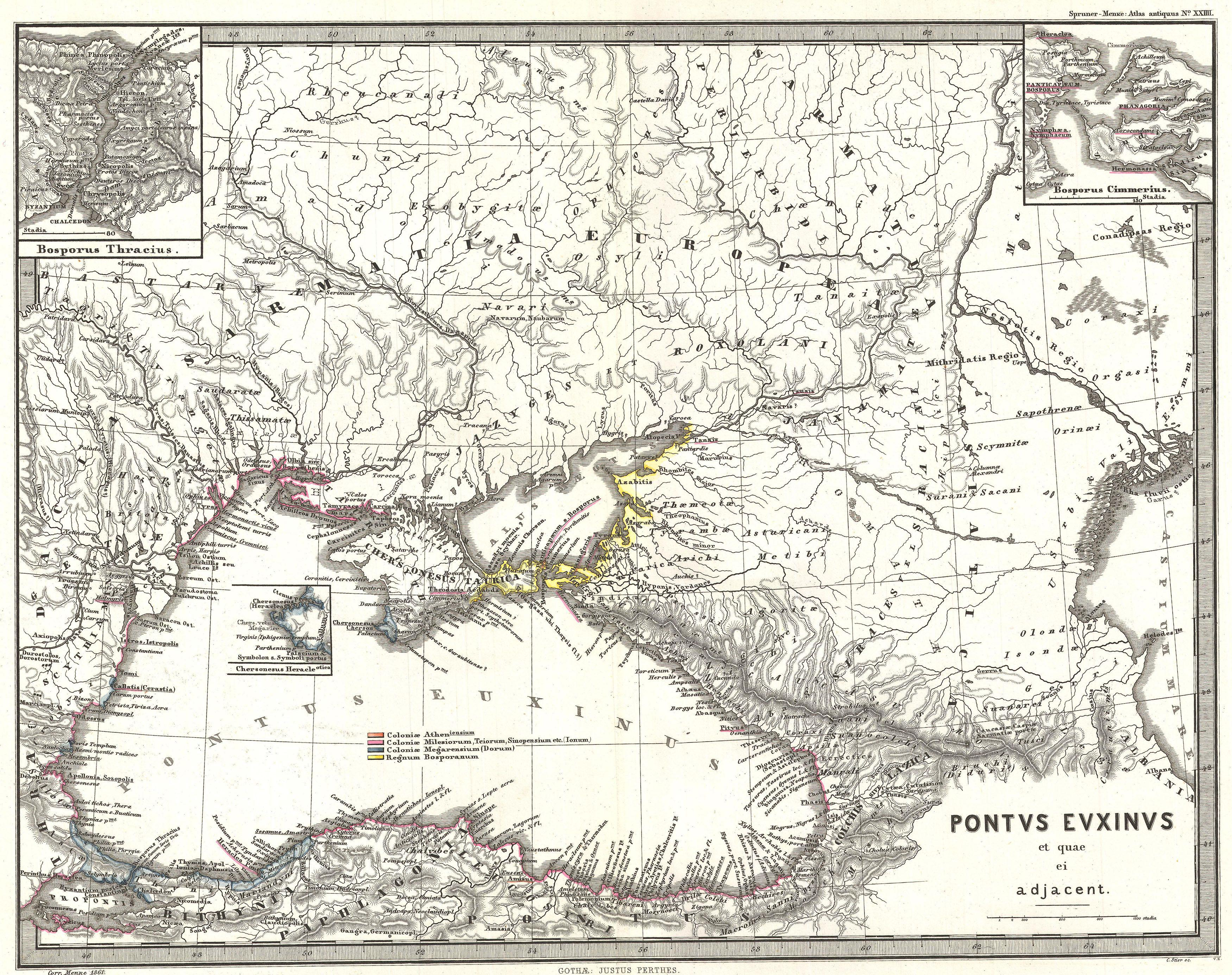
- Roman provinces that bordered the Pontus Euxinus, garrisoned in its southern part by the Classis Pontica.
- Active: Augustus/Nero - 7th century
- Countries: Roman Empire and Byzantine Empire
- Type: Naval force
- Size: A few thousands of classiarii (besides the legio I Pontica)
- Garrison/HQ: Bithynia and Pontus

Commanders
- Current commander: Praefectus classis

The Classis Pontica was a provincialis fleet, established initially by Augustus and then by Nero on a permanent basis (around 57). It was tasked with guarding the southern Pontus Euxinus, coordinating with the neighboring fleet of Mesia, the Classis Flavia Moesica.

== History ==
Established by Augustus in 14 BCE, it did not operate permanently until the principate of Nero. Indeed, it seems that as early as 46 a Roman naval expedition had pushed along the coast of Pontus Euxinus (Black Sea), as far as the Tanais River (Don River). In 57 a new expedition to the area reached the Tauric Chersonese, or the present Crimean peninsula. Following these events a new permanent fleet was created to garrison and patrol the Pontus Euxinus (today's Black Sea): the Classis Pontica.

During the civil war of 68-69, a certain Anicetus, praefectus Classis of the Classis Pontica, initially supported Vitellius. It is said that he burned the fleet and fled to Caucasian Iberia, turning himself into a fearsome pirate. And so a new fleet was built by the Romans, who eventually succeeded in suppressing the revolt.

During the period called the Crisis of the 3rd century, the fleet was engaged several times to face barbarian invasions. In 255, the Goths undertook a new attack, this time by sea, along the coast of Asia Minor, after commandeering numerous vessels from the Cimmerian Bosporus, an ally of Rome. The first to seize these vessels, however, were the Borans, who, traveling along the eastern coast of the Black Sea, pushed on to the very edge of the Roman Empire, near the city of Pityus, which fortunately for it had a very solid walled enclosure and a well-equipped harbor. Here they were repulsed thanks to vigorous resistance on the part of the local population, organized for the occasion by the then governor Successianus.

The Goths, on the other hand, having departed with their ships from the Crimean peninsula, reached the mouth of the Phasis River (located in the Guria region of Georgia, in the vicinity of the present town of Sukhumi); they also advanced toward Pityus, which they succeeded this time in occupying, partly because Successianus, who had been promoted prefect of the Praetorium, had followed Emperor Valerian to Antioch. The great fleet then continued on to Trapezounta, succeeding in occupying this important city as well, which was protected by a double wall and several thousand soldiers, as Zosimus relates:

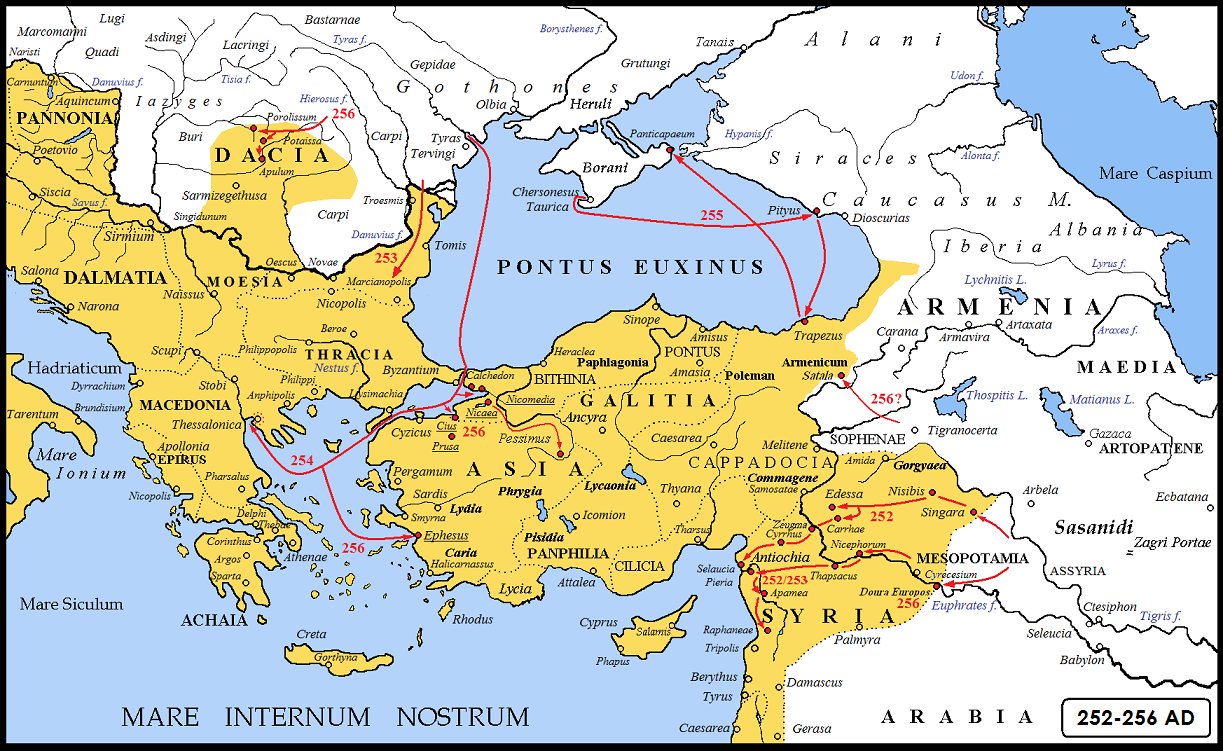
Barbarian invasions of Goths, Borans, Carpi, contemporary with those of the Sasanids of Shapur I, from the years 252-256, during the reign of Valerian and Gallienus.

The Goths, as soon as they noticed that the soldiers inside the walls were lazy and drunken and did not even go up along the walkways of the walls, pulled over a few logs to the wall, where it was possible, and in the middle of the night, went up in small groups and conquered the city. [...] The barbarians seized great wealth and a large number of prisoners [...] and after destroying the temples, buildings and all that was beautiful and magnificent, they returned home with many ships.

— Zosimus, New History, I, 33.

Loaded by now with huge spoils, on their way back they also sacked the city of Panticapaeum, in present-day Crimea, disrupting the grain supplies needed by the Romans in that region. The situation was so serious that Gallienus was forced to rush along the Danubian borders to reorganize his forces after this devastating invasion, as an inscription from the legionary fortress of Viminacium would testify.

The following year, in 256, a new invasion of Goths traveled along the Black Sea, again by sea but this time to the west coast, advancing as far as Lake Fileatina (present-day Derkos) west of Byzantium. From here they continued as far as below the walls of Chalcedon. The city was plundered of all its great riches, although, as Zosimus reports, the garrison outnumbered the Goth assailants. Many other important cities of Bithynia, such as Prusa, Apamea and Cius were sacked by the Gothic armies, while Nicomedia and Nicaea were set on fire.

Ten years after the first major invasion, in late 267-early 268, the Goths, together with Peucini, the "newcomers" to the region of the present-day Azov Sea, the Heruli and numerous other peoples launched the most astonishing invasion of the third century from the mouth of the Tyras River (near the city of the same name), which disrupted the coasts and hinterland of the Roman provinces of Asia Minor, Thracia, and Achaia facing the Pontus Euxinus and the Aegean Sea.

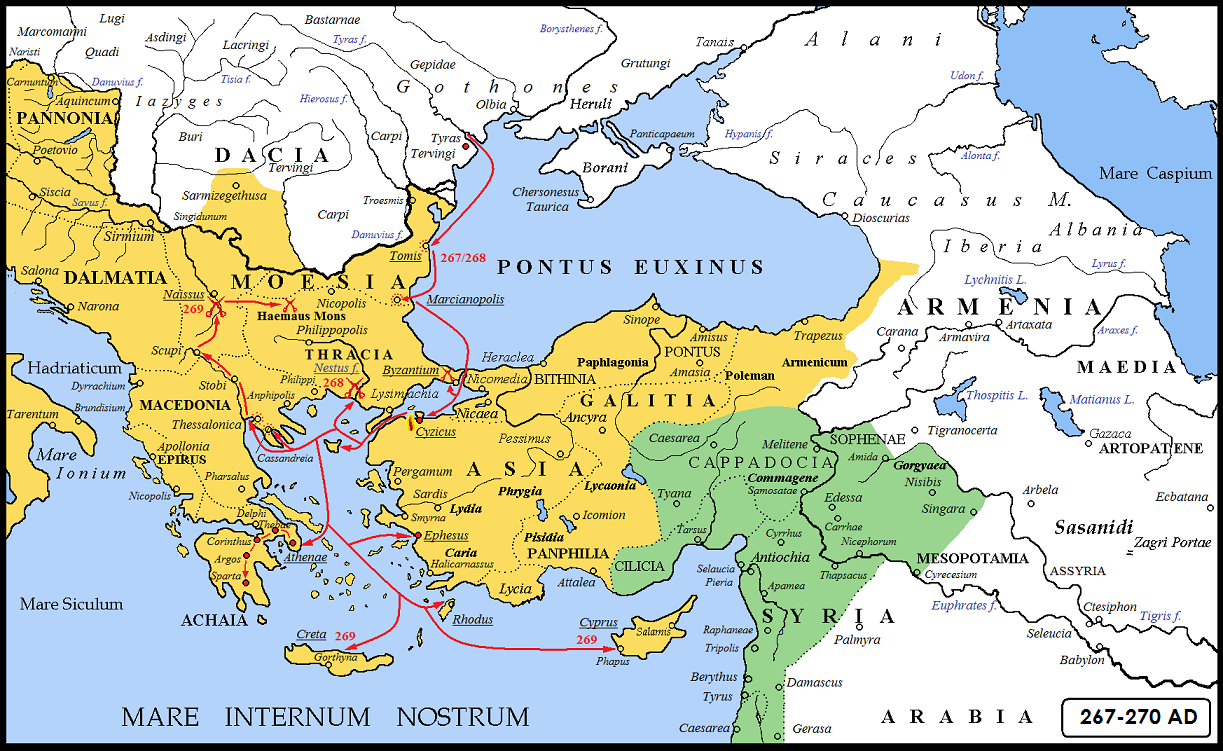
The invasion of the Gothic peoples of 267/268-270 during the reigns of Gallienus and Claudius Gothicus. In green color the Palmyrene Empire of Zenobia and Vaballathus.

The Scythians (to be understood as Goths, ed.), sailing through Pontus Euxinus penetrated the Danube and brought great devastation to Roman soil. Gallienus, having known these facts, gave the Byzantines Cleodamus and Athenaeus the task of rebuilding and walling the cities, and when fighting near Pontus the barbarians were defeated by the Byzantine generals. The Goths were also beaten in a naval battle by the general Venerian, and he himself died during the fight.

— Historia Augusta - The Two Gallieni, 13.6-7.

And so the various tribes of Scythia, such as Peucini, Greuthungi, Ostrogoths, Thervingi, Visigoths, Gepids, Celts and Heruli, lured by the hope of loot, came to Roman soil and wrought great devastation here, while Claudius was engaged in other actions (against the Alamanni, ed. ..). Three hundred and twenty thousand armed men were fielded from the different populations... as well as having two thousand ships (six thousand according to Zosimus), i.e. twice the number used by the Greeks... when they undertook the conquest of the cities of Asia (the Trojan War, ed.)

— Historia Augusta - Life of Claudius, 6.2-8.1.

== Ports ==
The main port of the Classis Pontica was placed at Trapezous (today's Trabzon in Turkey) after the annexation of Pontus around 63 B.C., used for patrolling especially the eastern part of the Black Sea. This was where the fleet of Mucianus was concentrated in 69, before traveling to Illyricum and then to Italy during the civil war of those years. And also from this port Arrian departed on patrol of the eastern coast of Pontus Euxinus. In addition, some vexillationes of legions XII Fulminata and XV Apollinaris may belong to this period as well. From the Tetrarchic period an entire Roman legion, Legio I Pontica, was installed here for greater protection of the coast.

Another important military base of the fleet, protecting the western part of the Black Sea and the straits of the Dardanelles, was Cyzicus, which had a number of vessels in Caesar's time. Marcus Junius Brutus gathered a fleet there, while Strabo claimed there were more than two hundred bays. The fleet of Septimius Severus was stationed there before the decisive clash against his rival Pescennius Niger in 193. A fleet was also present there in 218. The port was still reported to have been fortified to protect the fleet in 365.

== Types of vessels ==
The Classis Pontica used ships belonging to the previous kingdom of Thrace (annexed in 46 by Claudius).

== Troop corps ==
For the Pontic provincial fleet, the number of personnel was around a few thousand classiarii, which was increased by the fourth century with the creation of Legio I Pontica. The commander of the fleet was the praefectus classis or the commander of the southern part of Pontus Euxinus, pertaining to the equestrian order. In his turn the direct subordinate of the praefectus was a sub praefectus, who in turn was accompanied by a series of praepositi, officers placed in charge of each patrol by individual locality.

Other officers were the Navarchus princeps, which would correspond to the rank of rear admiral today. In the 3rd century the Tribunus classis was created with the functions of the Navarchus princeps, later tribunus liburnarum.

A single ship was commanded by a trierarchus (officer), oarsmen and a centuria of sailor-combatants (manipulares / milites liburnarii). The fleet staff (Classiari or Classici) was therefore divided into two groups: the sailors and the soldiers. Service lasted 26 years (as opposed to 20 for the legionaries and 25 for the auxilia). From the third century it was increased to 28 years of service. At the time of discharge (Honesta missio) sailors were given a settlement, land and usually also granted citizenship, as they were in the condition of peregrini at the time of enlistment. Marriage, on the other hand, was allowed to them only at the end of permanent active service. Below are some notable praefecti classis:

- Anicetus, who initially supported Vitellius in the civil war of 68-69.
- Marcus Gavius Bassus, in the time of Trajan;
- Lucius Julius Vehilius Gratus Julianus, at the time of the Marcomannic wars.

== See also ==
- Roman navy
- Classis Flavia Moesica
- Black Sea
- Bithynia and Pontus

== Bibliography ==
- Ammianus Marcellinus. The History.
- Appian. The Illyrian Wars. Archived from the original on October 22, 2017.
- Augustus. Res Gestae Divi Augusti.
- Cassius Dio. Roman History.
- Julius Caesar. Commentarii de Bello Gallico.
- Julius Caesar. Commentarii de Bello Civili.
- Codex Justinianus. Vol. XI.
- Codex Theodosianus. Vol. I–XVI.
- Herodian. History of the Roman Empire since the Death of Marcus Aurelius. Vol. VI–VIII. Archived from the original on October 31, 2012.
- Eutropius. Breviarium historiae romanae. Vol. IX.
- Fasti triumphales AE 1930, 60.
- Florus. Epitomae. Vol. I.
- Jordanes. Getica. Archived from the original on 2008-02-13.
- George Syncellus. The Chronography.
- Libanius. Orationes. Vol. XX.
- Livy. Ab Urbe condita libri.
- Livy. Periochae.
- Notitia Dignitatum.
- Panegyrici Latini. Vol. VII–X. In aedibus B.G. Teubneri. 1874.
- Pliny the Younger. Panegyric of Trajan.
- Polybius. Histories.
- Strabo. Geography. Vol. VIII.
- Suetonius. De vita Caesarum libri VIII.
- Tacitus. Annals.
- Tacitus. Historiae.
- Tacitus. De vita et moribus Iulii Agricolae.
- Vegetius. Epitoma rei militaris.
- Velleius Paterculus. Historiae Romanae ad M. Vinicium libri duo.
- Zosimus. New History.
- J.P. Colbus, E. Abranson (1979). La vita dei legionari ai tempi della guerra di Gallia. Milano.
- Brizzi, Giovanni (2007). Scipione e Annibale. La guerra per salvare Roma. Bari-Roma. ISBN 9788842083320.
- Carro, Domenico (December 2002). Classica, appendici marittime. in Supplemento alla Rivista Marittima, n. 12.
- Cascarino, Giuseppe (2008). L'esercito romano. Armamento e organizzazione, Vol. II - Da Augusto ai Severi. Rimini: Il Cerchio.
- Cascarino, Giuseppe; Sansilvestri, Carlo (2009). L'esercito romano. Armamento e organizzazione, Vol. III - Dal III secolo alla fine dell'Impero d'Occidente. Rimini: Il Cerchio.
- Coarelli, Filippo (1999). La colonna Traiana. Roma.
- Connolly, Peter (1976). L'esercito romano. Milano: Mondadori.
- Connolly, Peter (1998). Greece and Rome at war. Londra: Greenhill Books.
- Goldsworthy, Adrian (2000). The Fall of Carthage: The Punic Wars 265–146 BC.
- Grant, Michael (1984). Gli imperatori romani: storia e segreti (in Italian). Newton Compton.
- Gruen, Erich S. (1984). The Hellenistic World and the Coming of Rome: Volume II. University of California Press.
- Keppie, L. (1998). The Making of the Roman Army, from Republic to Empire. Londra.
- Klein, M.J. (1998). Traiano e Magonza. La capitale della provincia della Germania superior. Milano: nel catalogo della mostra Traiano ai confini dell'Impero di Ancona presso Mole Vanvitelliana, a cura di Grigore Arbore Popescu.
- Leach, John (1983). Pompeo, il rivale di Cesare. Milano.
- Lewis, Archibald Ross; Runyan, Timothy (1985). European Naval and Maritime History, 300-1500. Indiana University Press. ISBN 9780253320827.
- Le Bohec, Yann (1993). L'esercito romano. Le armi imperiali da Augusto alla fine del III secolo. Roma: Carocci.
- Le Bohec, Yann (2008). Armi e guerrieri di Roma antica. Da Diocleziano alla caduta dell'impero. Roma: Carocci.
- MacGeorge, Penny (2002). Late Roman Warlords. Oxford University Press. Appendix: Naval Power in the Fifth Century.
- Maxfield, V.A. (1989). "VIII". In Wacher, J. (ed.). Il mondo di Roma imperiale: la formazione. Bari-Roma. L'Europa continentale.
- Mazzarino, Santo (1976). L'Impero Romano. Rome: Laterza.
- Meijer, Fik (1986). A History of Seafaring in the Classical World. Routledge.
- Milan, Alessandro (1993). Le forze armate nella storia di Roma Antica. Roma: Jouvence.
- Piganiol, André (1989). Le conquiste dei Romani. Milano.
- Potter, David (2004). "The Roman Army and Navy". The Cambridge Companion to the Roman Republic. Cambridge University Press.
- Reddé, Michael (1986). Mare nostrum. Paris.
- Saddington, D.B. (2007). "Classes. The Evolution of the Roman Imperial Fleets". A Companion to the Roman Army. Blackwell Publishing Ltd.
- Southern, Patricia (15 May 2015). The Roman Empire from Severus to Constantine. Routledge. ISBN 978-1-317-49693-9.
- Starr, Chester G. (1960). The Roman Imperial Navy: 31 B.C.-A.D. 324 (2nd ed.). Cornell University Press.
- Starr, Chester G. (1989). The Influence of Sea Power on Ancient History. Oxford University Press US.
- Treadgold, Warren T. (1997). A History of the Byzantine State and Society. Stanford University Press.
- Warry, John (2004). Warfare in the Classical World. Salamander Books Ltd.
- Webster, Graham (1998). The Roman Imperial Army of the First and Second Centuries A.D. introduzione di Hugh Elton. University of Oklahoma Press. ISBN 9780806130002.
