= Pay (Roman army) =

Pay in the Roman army

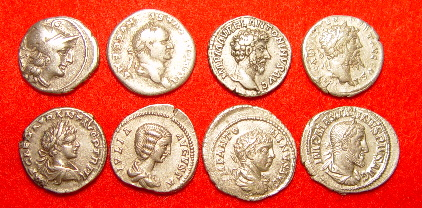
Some examples of denarius, annual pay of soldiers in the Roman army. Top: approx. 157 BC. Roman Republic, approx. 73 AD. Vespasian, approx. 161 Marcus Aurelius, approx. 194 Septimius Severus; bottom: approx. 199 Caracalla, approx. 200 Julia Domna, approx. 219 Elagabalus, approx. 236 Maximinus Thrax

Pay in the Roman army was defined by the annual stipendium received by a Roman soldier, of whatever rank he was, from the Republican era until the Later Roman Empire. It constituted the main part of the Roman soldier's income, who from the end of the Republic began to receive, in addition to the spoils of war, prize money called donativa. The latter grew to such an extent in the following centuries that by the 4th century, the ancient stipendium constituted only 10–15% of the Roman legionary's entire income.

== History ==
=== Republican Era ===
==== The first stipendium in the late 5th century BC ====
During 407 BC, when the Roman army was divided into three parts and sent to plunder the enemies' territory under the command of three of the four military Tribunes (Lucius Valerius Potitus headed for Anzio, Gnaeus Cornelius Cossus headed for Ecetra, and Numerius Fabius Ambustus attacked and conquered Anxur, leaving the prey to the soldiers of all three armies), the stipend for the soldiers was established, perhaps at the direction of Furius Camillus himself. Below is how Livy tells it:

"The patricians then added a most opportune gift for the plebs: the Senate decreed, with no prior mention of it to plebs or tribunes, that soldiers should receive a stipend drawn from the State coffers. Until that time each person fulfilled military service at his own expense. (60) As far as we know, no measure was greeted with such joy by the plebs."

— Livy, Ab Urbe condita libri, IV, 59–60, op. cit.

The consequences were obvious: acknowledgements from the plebeians, controversy from the Tribunes who saw some of their weapons blunted, protests from those who had to pay. The immediate benefit was that a law declaring war on Veius was passed, and the new Tribunes with military power led an army there consisting mostly of volunteers. And perhaps, also under this circumstance, the legion may have assumed the manipular system as its battle formation.

At the time of the Punic Wars, pay was set at 2 obols per day, or one-third of a drachma (one denarius after 211 BC), for the period they were under arms. In addition, each infantryman was entitled to a share of the spoils of war (prisoners were sold as slaves, as well as animals, treasure, weapons, and other goods), which were auctioned off and the proceeds distributed to officers and men according to various criteria. Centurions received twice the pay of their men, that is, four obols or two-thirds of a drachma a day. As for the food ration, infantrymen were distributed about two-thirds of an Attic medimnos of grain per month.

It is also known from Polybius that if the pay distributed to Roman horsemen was one drachma a day, three times what an infantryman earned, the monthly rations were seven medimnoi of barley and two of wheat. Allies (socii), on the other hand, were given one medimnos and a third of wheat free of charge, as well as five of barley per month. To the allies all this was given as a gift. In the case of the Romans, on the other hand, the quaestor deducted from the stipendium the price set for wheat, clothing, and any weapons that they might need.

==== The reform of Gaius Marius (107–101 BC) ====
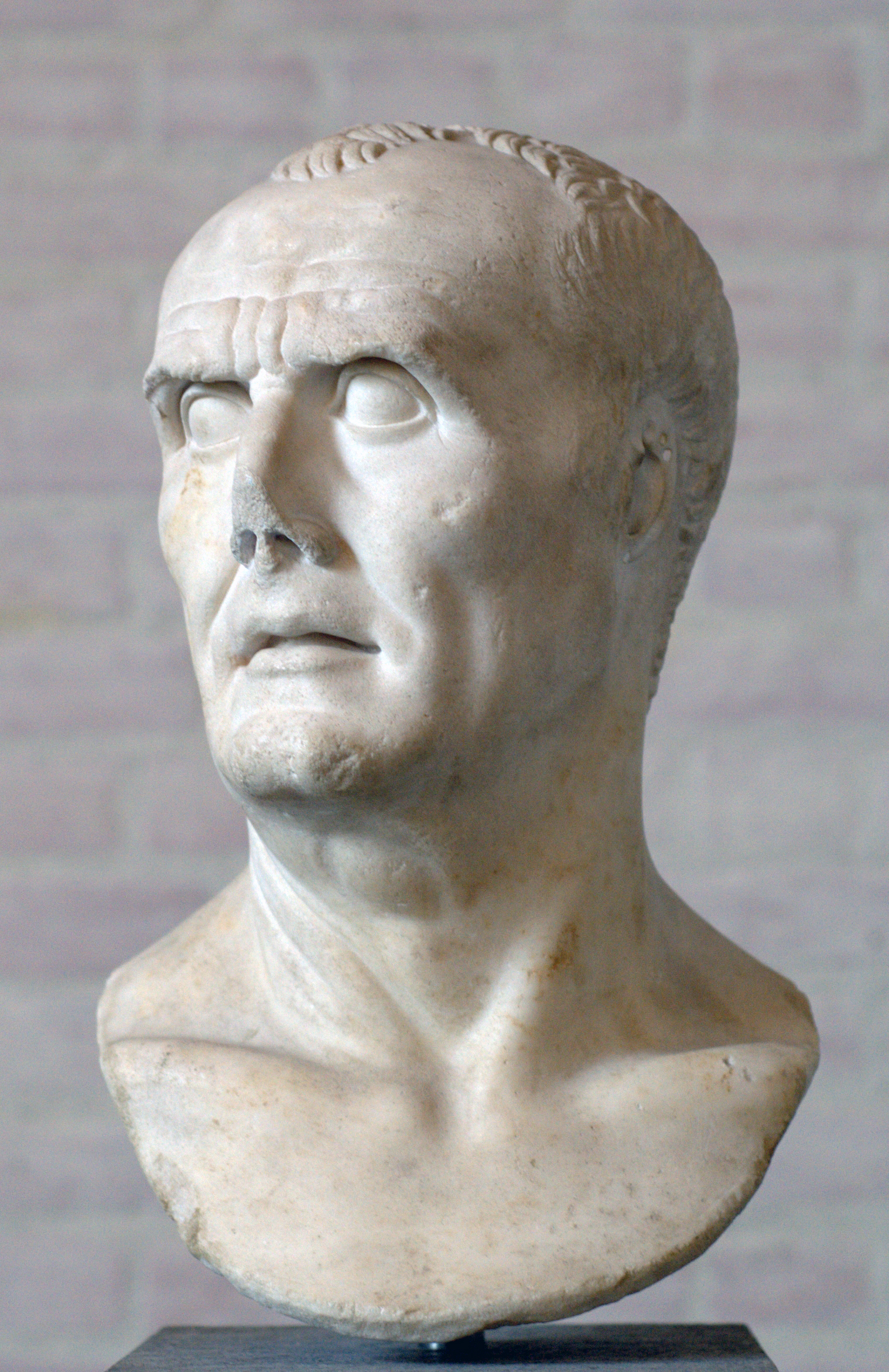
Marble bust of Gaius Marius.

Toward the end of the 2nd century BC Rome had found itself embroiled in a war in Numidia, in which, because of the lack of appeal of any kind, it was almost impossible to find new recruits. From this premise the consul of that year, Gaius Marius, decided to open the legions to anyone, whether or not they were landowners, as Sallust tells it:

Marius noticed that the spirits of the plebs were full of enthusiasm. Without wasting any time he loaded the ships with weapons, stipendium for the soldiers and anything else useful, ordering Manlius to embark. He, meanwhile, enlisted soldiers, not as was the custom at that time, by social classes, but rather by accepting all volunteers, for the most part destitute of (capite censi).

— Sallust, Bellum Iugurthinum, LXXXVI

Permanent active duty thus underwent a major change in 107 BC. The Roman Republic was forced to take on the burden of equipping and supplying legionary troops, allowing everyone, including have-nots, to enlist. The minimum age for volunteers (no longer forced to serve) was now set at 17, and the maximum at 46. This was the first example of a professional army where conscription by census was abolished, while veteran soldiers, who drew daily sustenance (food and lodging, as well as equipment) from the army, received a pension in the form of land allotments in the colonies and, later on, of Roman citizenship as well. To them, Marius and then subsequent commanders also granted to share the spoils plundered during military campaigns.

==== In Caesar's time ====
Caesar did not, in the course of the conquest of Gaul, deprive his soldiers of the opportunity to loot, but the mere legionary had to be clear about the ultimate goal of the campaign, and his actions were not to affect the commander's operational plans. Aware of the misery of his soldiers, Caesar, on his own initiative, doubled the pay in 51–50 BC from 5 to 10 asses per day (equal to 225 denarii per year), so that the legionary's pay remained unchanged until the period of Emperor Domitian (81-96).

He, unlike many of his predecessors who provided troops with occasional donations, deemed it necessary to give continuity to the service the soldiers provided, instituting the right to a reward in land for discharge, in accordance with the custom that until then had been at the total discretion solely of the commander.

=== High Empire ===
During the High Empire, supply to the troops, stationed along the imperial borders, was ensured by a system of food collection, including through forced requisitions (against reimbursement), called annona militaris. Basically, from the pay of legionaries and auxiliaries all costs associated with their maintenance were, then, deducted. The stipendium was, therefore, composed of a pay in coin and one "in kind."

==== In the time of Augustus (30 BC – 14 AD) ====
Augustus reorganized the entire system of the imperial border defenses, permanently quartering legions and auxilia in fortresses and forts along the limes. He brought order to the financial administration of the Roman state, awarding a salary and leave bonus to all soldiers in the imperial army (both legionaries and auxiliaries) with the creation of an aerarium militare.

With reference to the auxiliary troops Augustus offered them a four-monthly pay and uniform equipment, equal to about 1/3 of what a legionary (who received 225 denarii annually) received, that is, around 75 denarii annually. The stipendium of an Ala knight, however, was higher than that of a Roman legionary, hovering around 250 denarii, while that of a knight of cohors equitata ranged around 200 denarii. In essence, the equites alares (Ala knights) were the highest paid: after them were the infantrymen of a cohors equitata with 150 denarii and finally those of a cohors peditata. According to some recent calculations, the annual outlay that the aerarium militare had to spend to maintain this massive army was between 31,000,000 denarii according to some and 65,000,000 denarii according to others.

Here is how the historian Tacitus describes military service and soldier pay in the time of Augustus (in the year 14):

"Military service is, in its essence, strenuous and yields nothing: one's soul and body are valued at ten assēs a day, and with these one must pay for clothing, weapons, tents, as well as to save oneself from the abuse of the centurions or to buy some exemption from some toil."

— Tacitus, Annales, I, 17.

The final reward upon discharge, almost as if it were a form of modern severance package, was 3,000 denarii for legionaries, while praetorians were given as much as 5,000 denarii.

==== In the time of Domitian (81–96) ====
The first increase in a soldier's pay in imperial times was in the time of Domitian, who increased it by a quarter not only the stipendium of legionaries, but also that of auxiliary units, thus bringing the annual compensation to 333 denarii for an Ala knight, 266 denarii for a knight of cohors equitata, and 200 denarii for a foot soldier of cohors equitata.

==== In the time of Septimius Severus (193–211) ====
Septimius Severus favored legionaries in several ways, increasing their pay and granting them the right to marry while in service, as well as allowing them to live with their families outside the camp (canabae). This reform entailed a "regionalization" of the legions, which in this way became tied not only to their commander but also to a specific territory.

==== In the time of Caracalla (211–217) ====
With the introduction of the Constitutio Antoniniana by Emperor Caracalla, Roman citizenship was granted to all inhabitants of the empire except the dediticii. The aim was to increase tax revenues in the treasury's coffers to attempt to meet the rising costs of military salaries needed to maintain armies along the frontiers.

==== Maximinus Thrax (235) ====
According to Herodian's version, the revolt of the soldiers that led to the death of Alexander Severus was mainly due to the fact that many of the soldiers of Pannonian origin, who were very devoted to Maximinus, felt that Alexander was depending too much on his mother's power and was behaving cowardly in conducting the Germanic war against the Alemanni. They recalled the recent disasters in the East caused by the Emperor's continued hesitation. Thus they planned the killing of Alexander and the elevation to the imperial purple of Maximinus, to whom they apparently threw the purple mantle as he passed for inspection. While at first he refused, he later decided to accept, although he felt that such acclamation should be followed by the immediate killing of Alexander before he organized his legions. And so after promising to double their stipendium, new donativa, and cancel all punishments, he marched decisively against Alexander's camp (which was located at Mogontiacum).

==== Summary table of military stipendia: from Augustus to Maximinus Thrax ====
Below is a table that attempts to summarize, based on calculations made by some modern scholars and the little literary evidence of the time, as well as limited archaeological-epigraphic documentation that has come down to us, the annual pay of Roman soldiers:

Roman legion	Augustus (in denarii)	Domitian (in denarii)	Septimius Severus (in denarii)	Caracalla (in denarii)	Maximinus Thrax (in denarii)
legionary (miles)	225	300	450	675	1350
immunis	225	300	450	675	1.350
principalis sesquiplicarius (= pay equal to 1.5 times) (Cornicen, Tesserarius e Beneficiarius)	337	450	675	1.012	2.025
principalis duplicarius (= pay equal to 2 times) (Optio, Aquilifer, Signifer, Imaginifer, Vexillarius equitum, Cornicularius, Campidoctor)	450	600	900	1.350	2.700
principalis triplicarius (= pay equal to 3 times) (Evocatus)	675	900	1350	2025	4050
Legionary knight	262	350	525	787	1.575
Centurion / decurion	3.375	4.500	6.750	10.125	20.250
Centurion primo ordo	6.750	9.000	13.500	20.250	40.500
Centurion primus pilus	13.500	18.000	27.000	40.500	81.000
Praefectus castrorum	15.000	20.000	30.000	45.000	90.000
Tribunus angusticlavius	18.750	25.000	37.500	56.250	112.500
Tribunus laticlavius	30.000	40.000	60.000	90.000	180.000

Auxiliary troops	Augustus (in denarii)	Domitian (in denarii)	Septimius Severus (in denarii)	Caracalla (in denarii)	Maximinus Thrax (in denarii)
Infantryman of cohors peditata	75	100	150	225	450
Infantryman of cohors equitata	150	200	300	450	900
Knight of cohors equitata	200	267	400	600	1.200
Knight of Ala	250	333	500	750	1.500
Praefectus cohortis	3.375	4.500	6.750	10.125	20.250
Praefectus alae	11.250	15.000	22.500	33.750	67.500

Garrisons of Rome	Augustus (in denarii)	Domitian (in denarii)	Septimius Severus (in denarii)	Caracalla (in denarii)	Maximinus Thrax (in denarii)
praetorianus	750	1.000	1.500	2.250	4.500
urbanicianus	375	500	750	1.125	2.250
vigil	150	200	300	450	900

Navy	Augustus (in denarii)	Domitian (in denarii)	Septimius Severus (in denarii)	Caracalla (in denarii)	Maximinus Thrax (in denarii)
classiarius (Classis Misenensis)	150	200	300	450	900
classiarius (Classis Ravennatis)	150	200	300	450	900
classiarius (Classis provincialis)	75	100	150	225	450

==== Army costs in the first two centuries of the Empire ====
The impact of the costs of such a large army (from Augustus to the Severans) on the economy of the Roman Empire can be measured, albeit roughly, as follows:

Military expenditures as a percentage of the Roman Empire's GDP
Date	Empire population	Empire GDP (millions of denarii) (Note: Constant values as of 14 AD expressed in denarii, untied by increases in military pay to compensate for currency devaluation)	Cost of the military (millions of denarii)	Cost of the military (% of GDP)
14 AD.	46 million	5.000	123	2.5%
150 AD.	61 million	6.800	194 (Note: Duncan-Jones: costs of years 14–84, inflated by army increase, also assuming bonuses paid to auxiliaries after 84)	2.9%
215 AD.	50 million	5.435	223	4.1%

The cost of the entire army grew moderately as a % of GDP between AD 14 and 150, despite an increase in manpower of about 50%, from about 255,000 armed men in AD 23 to 383,000 under Hadrian, to about 442,000 by the death of Septimius Severus in 211.

This was because the population of the empire, and thus the total GDP, increased significantly (+35 percent approx.). Subsequently, the percentage of army spending toward GDP increased by almost half, although the increase in army personnel was only about 15% (from 150 to 215). This was mainly due to the Antonine plague, which epidemiological historians have estimated to have reduced the empire's population by 15% to 30%. However, even in 215, the Romans were spending a similar percentage on GDP as the defense of the only global superpower, the United States of America, spends today (amounting to 3.5 percent of GDP in 2003). However, the actual burden on taxpayers, in a quasi-agricultural economy with truly limited surplus production (80 percent of the imperial population depended on subsistence agriculture and an additional 10 percent on subsistence income), was certainly much heavier. Indeed, a study of imperial taxes in Egypt, by far the best-documented province, established that the burden was relatively heavy.

Military expenditures thus constituted about 75 percent of the total state budget, since "social" spending was little, whereas all the rest was spent on prestigious building projects in Rome and the provinces; this was supplemented by a grain subsidy for those found to be unemployed, as well as aid to the proletariat of Rome (congiaria) and subsidies to Italic families (similar to modern family allowances), to encourage them to beget more children. Augustus instituted this policy, distributing 250 denarii for every child born. Further subsidies were later introduced for Italic families (Institutio Alimentaria), by Emperor Trajan.

== See also ==
- Tributum
- Donativum
- Denarius

== Bibliography ==
- Marcellinus, Ammianus (2007). Salem, A. (ed.). Le Storie (testo latino a fronte). UTET. ISBN 978-88-02-07712-3.
- Caesar. Commentarii de Bello Gallico.
- Polybius. Histories. VI, 19-42.
- Sallust. Bellum Iugurthinum. LXXXVI.
- Vegetius. De re militari.
- Livy. Ab urbe condita libri. VIII.
- Herodian. Roman history. Vol. VI.
- Tacitus. Annales. I.
- Suetonius. Augustus.
- Suetonius. Domitian.
- Abranson, E.; Colbus, J.P. (1979). La vita dei legionari ai tempi della guerra di Gallia. Milan: Mondadori.
- Cambridge Ancient History (CAH). Vol. XI The High Empire (2nd ed.). pp. 70–192.
- Cascarino, G. (2007). L'esercito romano. Armamento e organizzazione. Vol. I – Dalle origini alla fine della repubblica. Rimini: -Il Cerchio.
- Cascarino, G. (2008). L'esercito romano. Armamento e organizzazione. Vol. II – Da Augusto ai Severi. Rimini: Il Cerchio.
- Cascarino, G.; Sansilvestri, C. (2009). L'esercito romano. Armamento e organizzazione. Vol. III – Dal III secolo alla fine dell'Impero d'Occidente. Rimini: Il Cerchio.
- Cheesman, G. L. (1914). The Auxilia during the first two century A.D. Oxford: Clarendon Press.
- Connolly, P. (1976). L'esercito romano. Milan: A. Mondadori.
- Connolly, P. (1998). Greece and Rome at war. London: Greenhill Books/Lionel Leventhal. ISBN 1-85367-303-X.
- Duncan-Jones, Richard (1994). Money and Government in the Roman Empire.
- Fields, N. (2006). Roman Auxiliary Cavalryman. Oxford: Osprey Publishing.
- Gabba, E. (1973). Esercito e società nella tarda Repubblica romana. Firenze: La nuova Italia.
- Goldsworthy, A. K. (1998). The Roman Army at War, 100 BC-AD 200. Oxford – N.Y: Clarendon Press.
- Goldsworthy, A.K. (2007). Storia completa dell'esercito romano. Modena: Logos. ISBN 978-88-7940-306-1.
- Keppie, L. (1998). The Making of the Roman Army, from Republic to Empire. London: University of Oklahoma Press.
- Le Bohec, Y. (1992). L'esercito romano da Augusto alla fine del III secolo. Rome: Carocci.
- Le Bohec, Y. (2008). Armi e guerrieri di Roma antica. Da Diocleziano alla caduta dell'impero. Rome: Carocci. ISBN 978-88-430-4677-5.
- MacMullen, R. (1980). "How Big was the Roman imperial Army?". KLIO: 454.
- Mazzarino, S. (1973). L'impero romano. Bari: Laterza.
- Milan, A. (1993). Le forze armate nella storia di Roma Antica. Rome: Jouvence.
- Parker, H. (1958). The Roman Legions. N.Y.: Barnes & Noble Inc.
- Reddé, M. (1986). Mare nostrum. Paris: École française de Rome.
- Rodríguez González, J. (2003). Historia de las legiones Romanas. Madrid: École française de Rome.
- Ruffolo, Giorgio (2004). Quando l'Italia era una superpotenza. Einaudi.
- Scheidel, Walter; Friesen, Steven (2009). "The Size of the Economy and the Distribution of Income in the Roman Empire". The Journal of Roman Studies. 99: 61–91. doi:10.3815/007543509789745223. S2CID 202968244.
- Stathakopoulos, D.Ch. (2007). Famine and Pestilence in the late Roman and early Byzantine Empire.
- Webster, G. (1998). The Roman Imperial Army. London – Oklahoma: University of Oklahoma Press.
