= Cohort (military unit) =

Roman military subdivision

A cohort (from the Latin cohors, pl.: cohortes) was a standard tactical military unit of a Roman legion. Although the standard size changed with time and situation, it was generally composed of 480 soldiers. A cohort is considered to be the equivalent of a modern military battalion. The cohort was the most important tactical unit in the Roman army. They could operate independently and offered flexibility and maneuverability, allowing the legions to quickly adapt to different combat situations. The cohort replaced the maniple. From the late second century BC and until the middle of the third century AD, ten cohorts (about 5,000 men total) made up a legion. Cohorts were named "first cohort", "second cohort", etc. The first cohort consisted of experienced legionaries, while the legionaries in the tenth cohort were less experienced.

== Legionary cohort ==
A legionary cohort of the early empire consisted of six centuriae, or centuries, each consisting of 80 legionaries, for a total of 480 legionaries. Early in the Republic, each centuria consisted of 100 men, hence their name. Each centuria was commanded by a centurion, who increased in seniority from the sixth to the first centuries; thus, the centurion of the sixth century was the most junior in the cohort, while the centurion of the first century was the most senior. In order of increasing seniority, the six centurions were titled hastatus posterior, hastatus prior, princeps posterior, princeps prior, pilus posterior, and pilus prior. The pilus prior would command the cohort overall. The nomenclature of the ranks was derived from the Republican manipular legions, where troops were grouped into three rankings; hastati for the most inexperienced, followed by principes, and finally triarii for the most experienced. Pilus was a name for a maniple of triarii, reflecting their use as spearmen, pilum being the Latin word for a javelin.

A century of 80 men was divided into ten contubernia, each of eight men, who shared a single A-frame tent together. A contubernium was led by a decanus, appointed from within the contubernium, and was most likely the longest-serving legionary of the eight. The decanus organised the erection of the unit's marching tent, and ensured his tent-mates kept things tidy. A contubernium was assigned one to two pack mules, which would carry heavier equipment and the contubernium's mill, for grinding their daily grain ration into flour. These duties would be carried out by camp slaves, of which one to two would be assigned to each contubernium. They tended to the pack mule, ensured legionaries had water on the march, and undertook such camp duties as cooking and washing, and such specialised trades as smithing or carpentry. While encamped, younger legionaries might be sent out to fetch fodder, firewood, and water for the contubernium.

A century of 80 men would be commanded by a centurion, assisted by four junior officers. The pay of a centurion fluctuated depending on their seniority; the most junior centurion in a legion received around ten times the standard rate of pay, while the most senior legionary centurion could receive some forty times the standard rate of pay. The centurion was assisted by an optio, who served as his second-in-command, and typically received double the legionary rate of pay. Third in seniority was a tesserarius, who exercised command over the nightly guard duties, and were responsible for distributing the watchwords for the camp. A tesserarius was typically paid one-and-a-half times the standard rate of pay. A century also had a signifer, who carried the century's standard into battle, and also served as the unit's treasurer, keeping track of the pay and expenses of the men. Signifers typically received double pay. Lastly, a cornicen, equipped with a cornu, served as a signaller, and received double pay. These officers would have their own support staff, tents, and mules. Thus, a cohort would consist of, on paper, 480 legionaries, 6 centurions, and 24 junior officers, with logistical support provided by 60–120 slaves, and 60–120 mules.

Ten cohorts of 480 legionaries would comprise a legion. Like the ranks of the centurions, cohorts would also follow a pattern of seniority; a legion's tenth cohort was its most junior, while the first cohort was the most prestigious, with its ranks filled with either veteran troops, or the best recruits. The commander of the first cohort's first century was known as the primus pilus or primipilus, a legion's most senior centurion. The primus pilus was eligible for promotion to praefectus castrorum or camp prefect, the third most senior officer in a legion, responsible for the day-to-day administration of a legion.

The first cohort was an aberration in that it consisted of five double-strength centuriae, each of 160 men, for a total of 800 men, as opposed to six centuries of 80 men. It was the unique honour of the first cohort's aquilifer to carry the legion's aquila, or eagle, standard into battle, which possessed a quasi-religious importance to the legionaries. Loss of an eagle was considered a mark of extreme shame and disgrace for a legion. A legion's first cohort also had an imaginifer, who carried an imago of the reigning Emperor, typically a three-dimensional relief of their likeness made of beaten metal.

Each cohort also had a small artillery corps. According to Vegetius, a 4th-century Roman author, each century was equipped with a scorpio, a small torsion-powered ballista, for a total of six per cohort. A contubernium would be deputed to operate the weapon, when required. Like most ancient artillery, these weapons were likely used in fixed positions for infantry defence, or in sieges. Each cohort also had one onager, a stone-throwing torsion-powered catapult. Vegetius stipulates that they were transported fully-assembled on ox-drawn carts, to ensure the onager was ready for immediate use. Additional equipment, such as rams, towers, or larger ballistae, were added as needed. Thus, by extrapolation, a legion had an artillery train of some sixty scorpios and ten onagers.

== Types of cohort ==
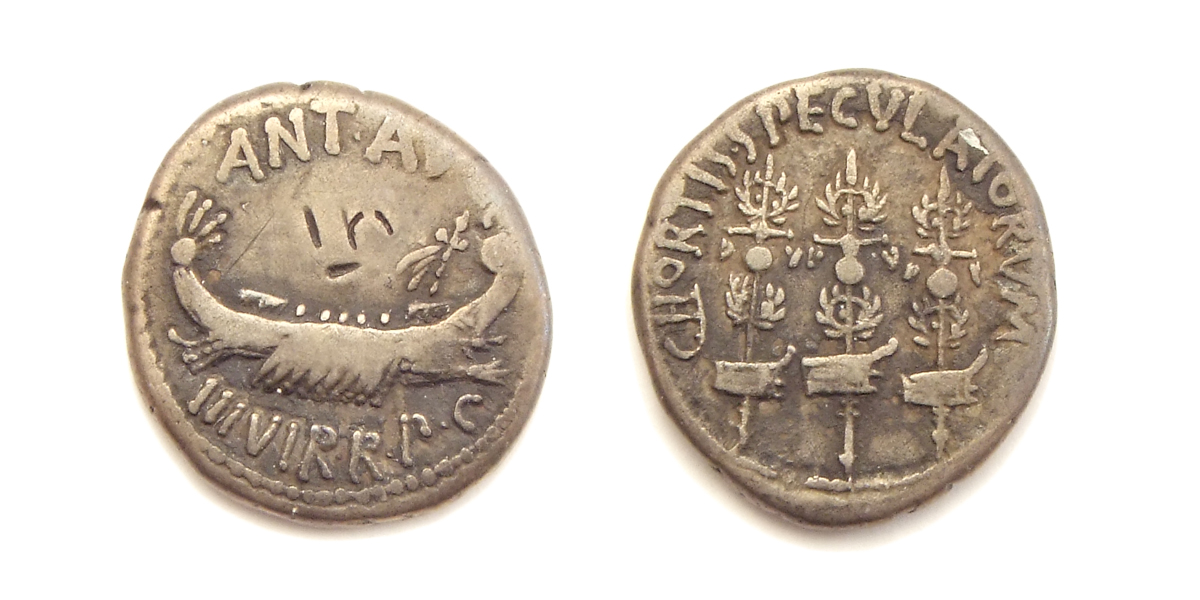
Denarius, struck under Mark Antony in honor of the cohors speculatorum

- Cohors alaria: allied or auxiliary unit
- Cohors quinquagenaria: auxiliary, nominally 500 strong
- Cohors milliaria: auxiliary, nominally 1000 strong
- Cohors classica: auxiliary unit originally formed of sailors and marines
- Cohors equitata: unit of auxiliary infantry with attached mounted squadrons
- Cohors peditata: infantry unit
- Cohors sagittaria: infantry auxiliary unit of bowmen
- Cohors speculatorum: guard unit of Mark Antony composed of scouts
- Cohors torquata: auxiliary unit granted a torques (military decoration)
- Cohors tumultuaria (from tumultus, "chaos"): irregular auxiliary unit

== Other Roman cohorts ==
Although not part of a legion, some paramilitary corps in Rome consisted of one or more cohorts:

- The nine cohortes praetoriae, never grouped to a legion, the Praetorians. The term was first used to refer to the bodyguard of a general during the Republic; later, a unit of imperial guards (temporarily restyled cohors palatina (imperial cohort), c. 300 AD, under Diocletian's tetrarchy).
  - Cohors togata was a unit of the Praetorian Guard in civilian clothes tasked with duties within the pomerium (sacred center of the capital, where all armed forces were forbidden).
- Cohortes urbanae, "urban cohort": Law enforcement officers patrolling in the capital, led by the Praefectus urbanus, or "urban prefect".
- Cohortes vigilum, "watchmen": Law enforcement officers forming the fire brigade in the capital, led by the Praefectus vigilum, or "prefect of the watchmen".
- Cohors Germanorum: the unit of Germani custodes corporis (imperial body guards recruited in Germania).

Furthermore, the Latin word cohors was used in a looser way to describe a rather large "company" of people (see, for instance, cohors amicorum).

== See also ==
- Auxiliaries (Roman military)
- List of Roman auxiliary regiments

== Sources ==
- Radin, Max (April 1915). "The Promotion of Centurions in Caesar's Army". The Classical Journal. 10 (7): 300–311. JSTOR 3287327.
