= Classis Flavia Moesica =

Fleet of the Roman Empire based on the Danube river

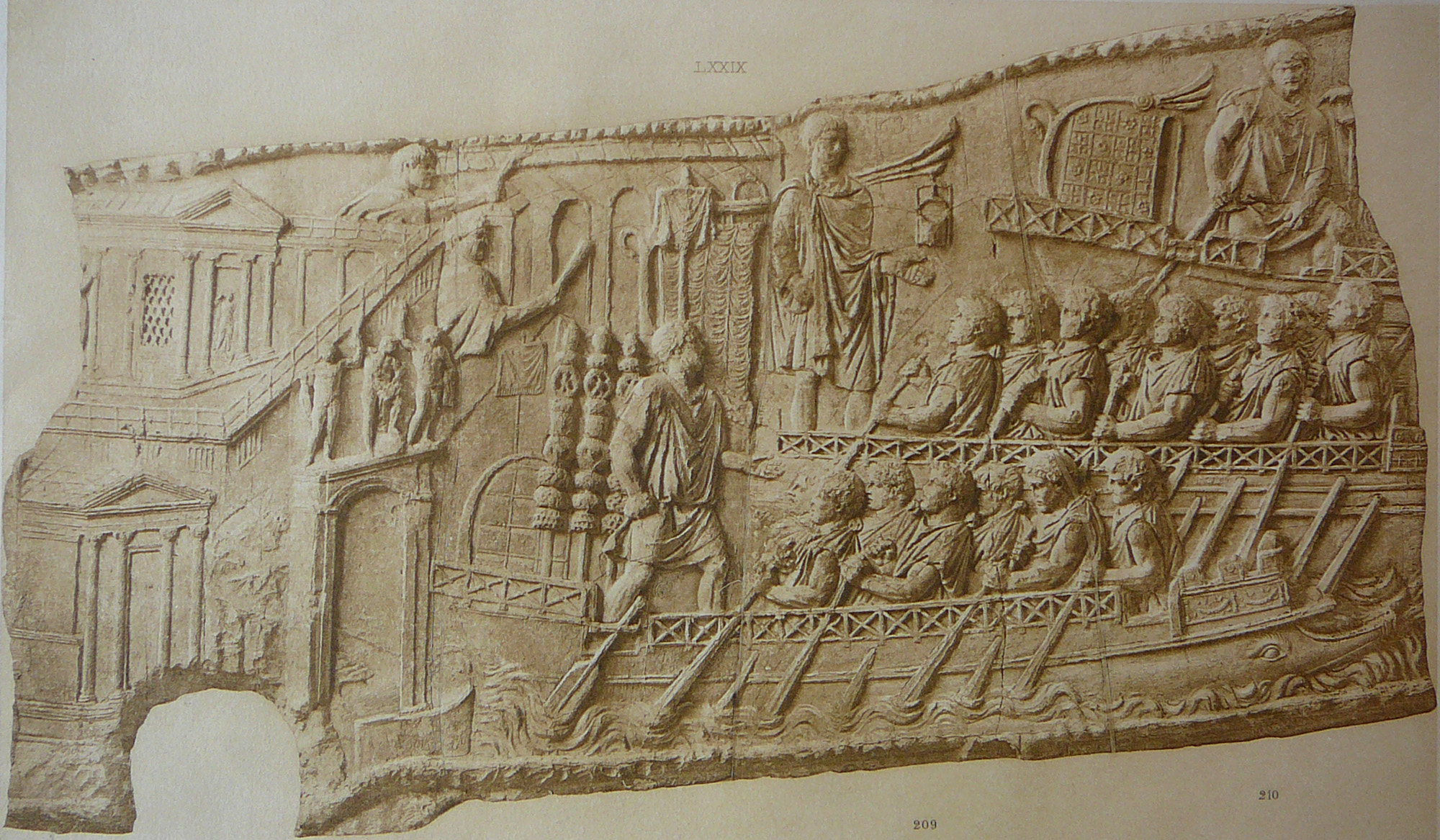
Two-banked liburnians of the Classis Moesica during Trajan's Dacian Wars. Casts of reliefs from Trajan's Column, Rome.

The Classis Flavia Moesica ("Flavian Fleet of Moesia") was the Roman Empire's fleet on the lower Danube river, near the Black Sea.

== History ==
The Classis Moesica was established sometime between 20 BC and 10 AD. It was based in Noviodunum and controlled the Lower Danube from the Iron Gates to the northwestern Black Sea as far as the Crimea. The honorific Flavia, awarded to it and to the Classis Pannonica, may indicate its reorganization by Vespasian around 75 AD. After Domitian (in 85 AD) it was headquartered in Sexaginta Prista. After Trajan's conquest of Dacia, during which the Classis Moesica provided logistical support, its base was moved back to Noviodunum. The fleet also included several secondary ports, like Carsium, Novae, Oescus and Tomis (modern Constanta). From 41 AD detachments were stationed in Crimea and Tyras.

Military diplomas show that the classis Moesica belonged to the army of Moesia Inferior.

The Classis Moesica lasted until the beginning of the fifth century, being later assimilated within the Byzantine navy.

== Ships and troops ==
The attested ships used by the Moesian fleet were mainly the ubiquitous liburnae used by most Roman provincial fleets, of which two names survive: "Armata" & "Sagita".

In Scythia Minor, during late Antiquity there were marines (muscularii) of legio II Herculia at "Inplateypegiis" and sailors (nauclarii) at Flaviana.

== See also ==
- Roman navy
- Classis Pontica

== Bibliography ==
- Starr, Chester G. (1960 [1941]) The Roman Imperial Navy: 31 B.C.-A.D. 324 (2nd Edition). Cambridge: Heffer.
- Webster, Graham; Elton, Hugh. (1998) The Roman Imperial Army of the First and Second Centuries A.D. Norman: University of Oklahoma Press. ISBN 0-8061-3000-8
