= Donativum =

Roman emperors' gifts of money to the troops

The donativum (plural donativa) was a gift of money by the Roman emperors to the soldiers of the Roman legions or to the Praetorian Guard. The English translation is donative.

The purpose of the donativa varied. Some were expressions of gratitude for favors received, and others outright bribery for favours expected in return. Donativa were normally rendered at the beginning of each new emperor's reign. During the 2nd and 3rd centuries, that form of bribery became a crucial part of any successful ruler in Rome. Such was the case with many of the soldier-emperors from 235 to 248.

The Praetorian Guard, intimate to the emperor's person, was an even greater threat to security. The cohorts stationed in Rome were difficult to appease and quick to assassinate. The donativum thus provided a significant way to purchase the Guard's support and loyalty.

Emperor Augustus bequeathed the Praetorian Guard a substantial sum in his will, but it was not until the reign of Tiberius that gifts of money were thought to be mandatory. The Praetorian Guard received such gifts for turning a blind eye when Sejanus, the praetorian prefect, fell from power. Each Praetorian Guard received 10 gold pieces in return for not defending Sejanus.

In 41, after the assassination of Caligula, the Guard supported Claudius, and the Senate briefly learned that the Guard had installed him on the throne. Claudius gave them 150 gold pieces, or some 3,750 denarii to which the senators' 100 sesterces were added annually to commemorate Claudius's accession. The inevitable result of the custom of the donativum was the Guard's auctioning of the empire to Didius Julianus in 193.

== Imperial Donativa to the Praetorian Guard 14–193 ==
Imperial Donativa to the Praetorian Guard 14–193
Year	Emperor	Provocation	Denarii
14	Augustus	Last will	250
31	Tiberius	Loyalty in Sejanus crisis	1,000
37	Caligula	Upon accession	500
41	Claudius	Upon accession	3,750
Annually	Claudius	Anniversary of accession to the throne	25
54	Nero	Accession	3,750
		Pay for assassinations	500 or less
69	Galba	Promised by Nymphidius Sabinus, but not paid	7,500
69	Otho	Promised	1,250
69	Vitellius	Promised	1,250
69	Vespasian	Regular donativum	unknown
79	Titus	Regular donativum	unknown
81	Domitian	Considered doubling the donativum but opted for regular sum	unknown
96	Nerva	Regular donativum	unknown
98	Trajan	Regular donativum	unknown
117	Hadrian	Double normal sum	unknown
136	Hadrian	Regular donativum upon Aelius' adoption	unknown
138	Antoninus Pius	Regular donativum and upon daughter's marriage	unknown
161	Marcus Aurelius	Joint rule with Verus	5,000
180	Commodus	Regular donativum; second promised but unpaid	unknown
193	Pertinax	Forced to pay donativum of Commodus	3,000
193	Didius Julianus	Purchased the throne	7,250
193	Septimius Severus	Promised a donativum but paid less	250

== See also ==
- Congiarium
- Pay (Roman army)
