= Discens =

Ancient Roman specialist soldier in training

A discens (Latin: discens, -entis) was a soldier of the military of ancient Rome who was in training to become an immunis, or specialist within the army.

Immunes took up the trades and skills of engineers, field medics, carpenters, and craftsmen. However, they were also fully trained and would be expected to fight in the infantry or cavalry if necessary. The discentes were probably exempted, like the immunes, from standard combat and camp duties since their main occupation would have been time-consuming technical training.

Some known classes include:

- Discens Architecti - Trainee engineer or artillerist.
- Discens Armaturae - Trainee weapons instructor.
- Discens Aquiliferum (or Aquiliferorum) - Trainee eagle standard-bearer.
- Discens Bucinatorem - Trainee trumpeter.
- Discens Capsariorum - Trainee medical orderly.
- Discens Epibatae - Trainee marine.
- Discens Equitum - Trainee cavalryman.
- Discens Lanchiariorum - Trainee javelin-thrower.
- Discens Mensorem - Trainee surveyor.
- Discens Phalangarium - A soldier training as a phalangarius during the 3rd century AD several experiments were conducted with Macedonian phalanx tactics, apparently requiring special training in weapons handling and drill.
- Discens Signiferorum (or discentes signiferorum) - Trainee standard-bearer.
