= Milites =

Milites (plural of the Latin word miles) were the trained regular footsoldiers of ancient Rome, and later a term used to describe soldiers in Medieval Europe.

== Roman Era ==
These men were the non-specialist regular soldiers that made up the bulk of a legion's numbers. Alongside soldiering, they also performed guard duties, labour work, building and other non-combat roles, which increased their status in urban centers. Milites would usually have to serve for several years before becoming eligible for training to become immunes and thus become specialists with better pay.

== Medieval Era ==
The Latin term eventually became synonymous with "soldier", a general term that, in Western Europe, became associated with the mounted knight, because they composed the professional military corps during the Early Medieval Era. The same term, however, was expanded to mean less distinguished infantry soldiers (milites pedites). During the 13th century the term referred to the mounted horsemen who lacked knight-status, but still had similar properties and obligations to the dubbed knights.

Other usages include the "Milites Templi," referring to the Knights Templar, or Milites Sancti Jacobi (Order of Santiago).

English words drived from the Latin root miles include military and militia.
