= Cetatea Pătulului =

Cetatea Pătulului is a Roman-Byzantine fortification, identified by some with the Roman name FLAVIANA (not Flaviana Castra), situated 2 km northwest of Cochirleni, Rasova commune, Romania.
