= Actuarius =

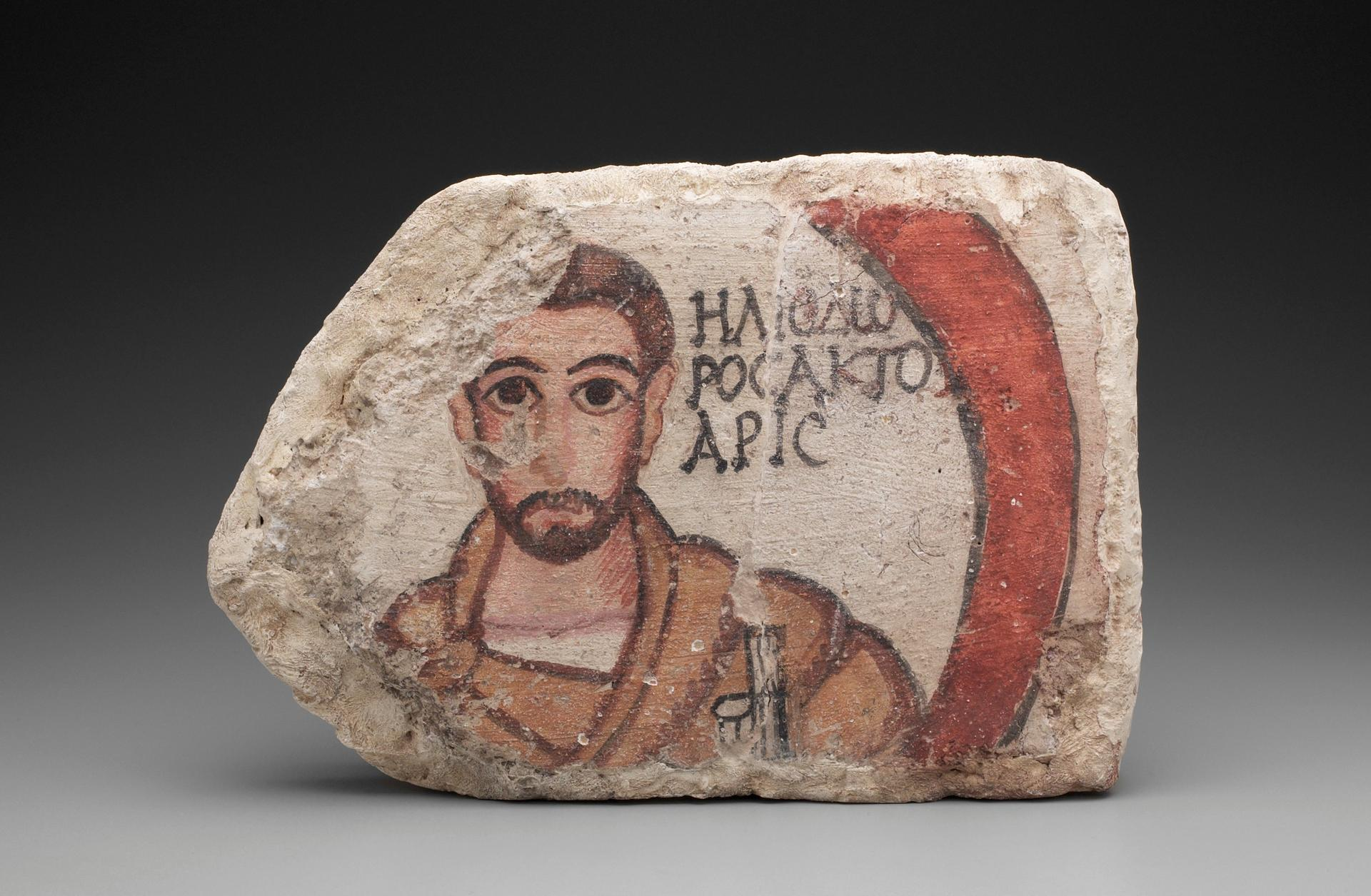
Tile (c. AD 200–256) from a ceiling in Dura-Europus with image of Heliodoros, an actuarius.

Actuarius or actarius, rendered in Greek as aktouarios (ἀκτουάριος), was the title applied to officials of varying functions in the late Roman and Byzantine empires.

In the late Roman Empire, the actuarius was an official charged with the distribution of wages and provisions to the Roman military. In this capacity, the post is attested at least until the 6th century, but appears only in antiquated legal texts thereafter. The title re-appears in the Taktikon Uspensky of circa 842 and the later Kletorologion of 899, but the role of its holder is unclear. In the 10th-century De Ceremoniis of Emperor Constantine VII Porphyrogennetos (r. 913–959), the aktouarios is mentioned as handing over awards to victorious charioteers, but in the 12th century (or perhaps in the 11th century) the term came to be applied to prominent physicians, possibly those attached to the imperial court (cf. John Actuarius).

== Sources ==
- Kazhdan, Alexander (1991). "Aktouarios". In Kazhdan, Alexander (ed.). The Oxford Dictionary of Byzantium. Oxford and New York: Oxford University Press. p. 50. ISBN 0-19-504652-8.
