= Corniculary =

A corniculary (Latin: corniculārius) or cornicular was an officer of the Roman legions who served as the adjutant to a centurion, so named for wearing a "cornicule" (Latin: corniculum), a small, horn-shaped badge supposed to have been worn on the office-holder's helmet.

== See also ==
- List of Roman army unit types
