= Immunes =

Ancient Roman specialist soldiers

The immunes were ancient Roman soldiers who possessed specialized skills. They were exempt from the more tedious and dangerous tasks other soldiers were required to do, such as ditch digging and rampart patrol.

== Becoming an immunis ==
Prior to becoming an immunis, men were required to serve as miles gregarius (also known as munifex), a non-specialist regular soldier. These men were the soldiers that made up the bulk of the legions, liable to perform guard duties, labour work and other less than desired duties. Milites would usually have to serve for several years before becoming eligible for training to become immunes.

Immunis status within the army was achieved either through selection or through promotion. If not possessing the specialist skills that could see a soldier chosen to become an immunis, the legionary who wished to become one would have to undergo a period of specialist training, during which time they would be known as discens. The discens received the same basic pay and board as the non-specialists until he qualified for immunis status.

== Typical duties ==
Engineers, artillerymen, musicians, drill and weapons instructors, military police, carpenters, hunters and medical staff were among the multiple specialized jobs immunes provided for the Roman army. Immunes also received better pay than the regular troops.
