= Roman Army during the Pax Romana =

Roman Army Organisation (27 BCE – 180 CE)

Roman army Roman Empire
- exercitus Romanus
- Motto: Gloria Exercitus

Leadership
- Imperator: Roman emperor

Personnel
- Conscription: 25 years
- Active personnel: 380, 000 during the reign of Trajan

Expenditure
- Percent of GDP: 5 to 7

The Roman Army during the Pax Romana (27 BCE – 180 CE) was structured into legions, auxiliary units, and naval forces, with soldiers drawn from both Roman citizens and non-citizens. Under reforms initiated by Augustus, the Roman military became a standing army, featuring standardized recruitment, training, and equipment, along with fixed terms of service and regular pay. The legions, composed of heavy infantry, were the backbone of the army, while auxiliary units provided specialized roles, such as cavalry, archers, and engineers. These forces both secured the empire's frontiers and contributed to infrastructure development.

== Command, control and organization ==
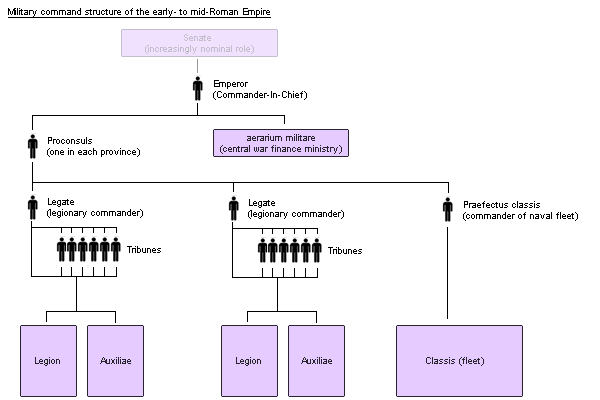
Military Command Structure during the early Empire.

The Roman Emperor was the sole Imperator (Commander-in-Chief). He commanded his troops via the Legati Augusti pro praetore who served as either as a general or a governor of an imperial province.

=== Legion ===
The legions were the principal force during the Pax Romana. Each legion had a numerical designation that was permanent. But due to the earlier civil wars these were sometimes duplicated, thus each legion had an individual name. These names could originated: from the name of a province where it was originally stationed, from an Emperor's dynastic name, from a god, from an aspect of its earned renown, from its formation as the ‘twin’ of an earlier legion or from some visible element of equipment. (Note: No names are recorded for Legiones XVII, XVIII and XIX, wiped out under Varus in the Teutoburg Forest disaster of AD 9, and, notoriously, these numbers were never allotted again. Equally, at some point in the 2nd century Legio VIIII Hispana disappeared from the army list (last attested in AD 131, it was absent from lists in the reign of Septimius Severus.)

The legions of the Roman Army did not always operate as complete formations. Temporary task forces, known as vexillationes (derived from vexillum, meaning "flag"), were frequently assembled on an ad hoc basis by detaching troops from legions to address specific crises or undertake offensive missions. These detachments often included auxiliary troops and varied in size, but a typical vexillation might consist of approximately 1,000 infantrymen and 500 cavalrymen. From 13 BCE to the mid-1st century CE, legionary veterans were transferred to a unit called the vexillum veteranorum after completing 16 years of service. They served an additional four years in this unit, which had a strength of about 500 men and its own officers. These units could be attached to their parent legion or deployed independently. Under Emperor Vespasian, the total term of service for legionaries was extended to 25 years.

The internal organization of a legion, while subject to minor variations over time or between different legions, generally adhered to a consistent structure. A legion's infantry strength ranged from approximately 4,800 to 6,200 milites legionis (legionary soldiers). Each legion was divided into centuriae (centuries), typically consisting of 80 men, though some might number 100. Each century was commanded by a centurio, assisted by junior officers, including the signifer (standard-bearer) or the aquilifer (eagle-bearer) in the First Century of the First Cohort, the optio (the centurion's deputy), the cornicen and bucinator (trumpeters), and the tesserarius (officer of the watchword).

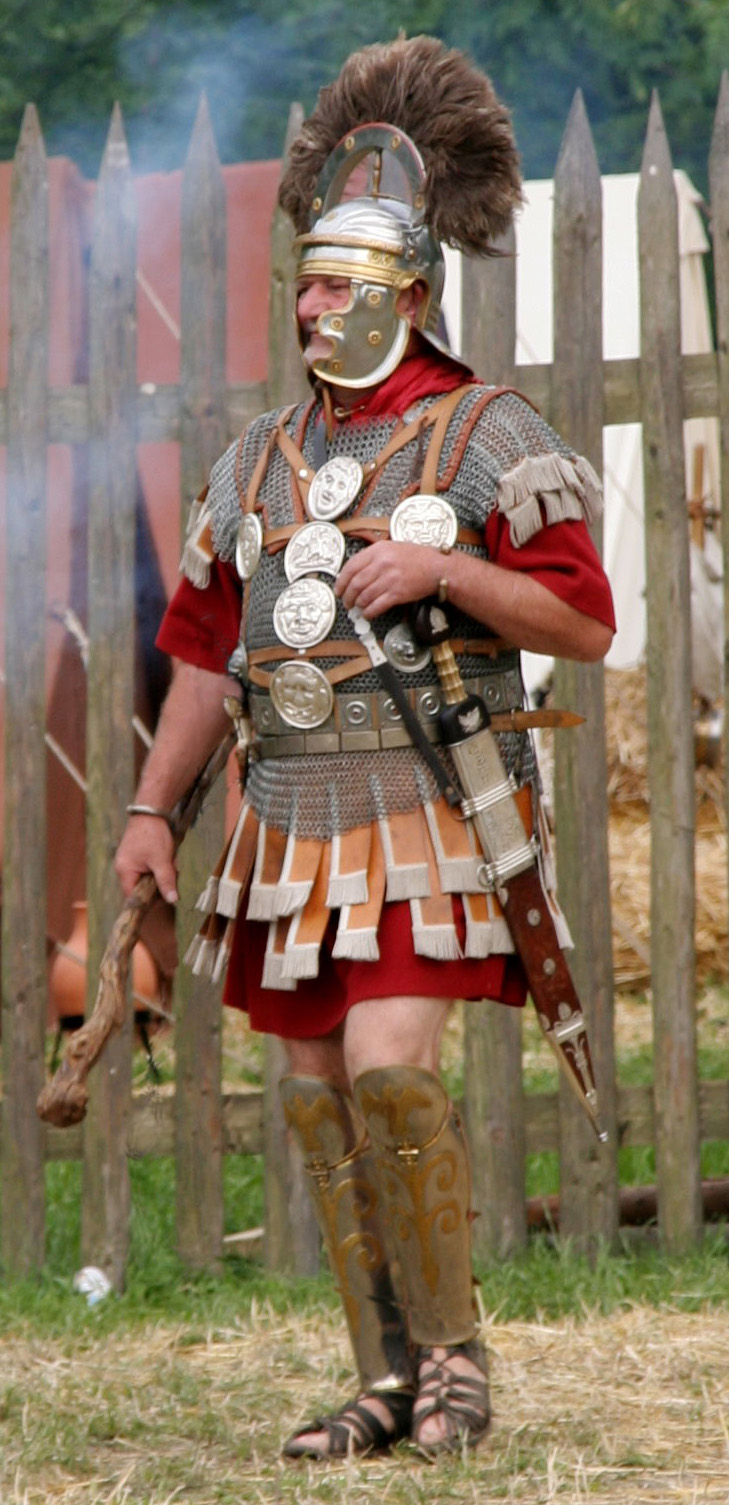
Reenactment of a Roman Centurio 70 A.C.

Specialized roles existed within the legion, such as the custos armorum (a soldier responsible for maintaining equipment) and the beneficiarius (a soldier or junior officer exempt from fatigue duties, often serving as a bodyguard or undertaking special tasks). The antesignani ("those before the standard") and postsignani ("those behind the standard"), terms dating back to the Consular period, continued to appear in sources during the Imperial era, referring to picked men fighting in front of or behind the standards.

Six centuries formed a cohors, a battalion of 480–600 men. Cohorts could also be subdivided into three manipuli, each consisting of two centuries and numbering 160–200 men. A legion typically comprised ten cohorts, though from the Flavian period onward, the First Cohort was double the size of the others, with 800–1,000 men organized into five double-sized centuries. This cohort was led by the primus pilus ("first javelin"), the most senior centurion in the legion. By the late 1st century CE, however, the tribunus laticlavius, a young aristocrat from a senatorial family, commanded the First Cohort. This tribune was one of six tribunes assisting the legionary commander, primarily in administrative roles; the other five were tribuni augusticlavi, from the equestrian social class.

The post of legionary commander was, except in Egypt, held by the legionary legate, a man of senatorial rank in his mid-thirties who had already held the praetorship in Rome. In provinces where there was only one legion, the posts of legionary legate and provincial governor were combined. The legate would expect to serve for three years and would, if married, normally be accompanied by his wife and family. As a man in his first or only legionary command would have little direct experience of military matters, he would rely heavily on the advice and experience of the senior centurion (primus pilus).

Below the legate, the officer with the most extensive military experience was the praefectus castrorum (camp prefect), usually a former primus pilus. The camp prefect oversaw all practical aspects of the legion's operations and assumed command in the absence of the legate or senior tribune. Theoretically they were appointed to specific legionary bases rather than individual legions, so that where two legions were brigaded together there was only one camp prefect. Each legion also included an integral cavalry unit of about 120 men, used primarily for reconnaissance and courier duties. These cavalrymen were organized into four turmae (squadrons) of 32 men each, with each turma commanded by a decurio. Additionally, each cohort of the legion was supported by approximately 120 calones (servants).

=== Praetorian guard ===
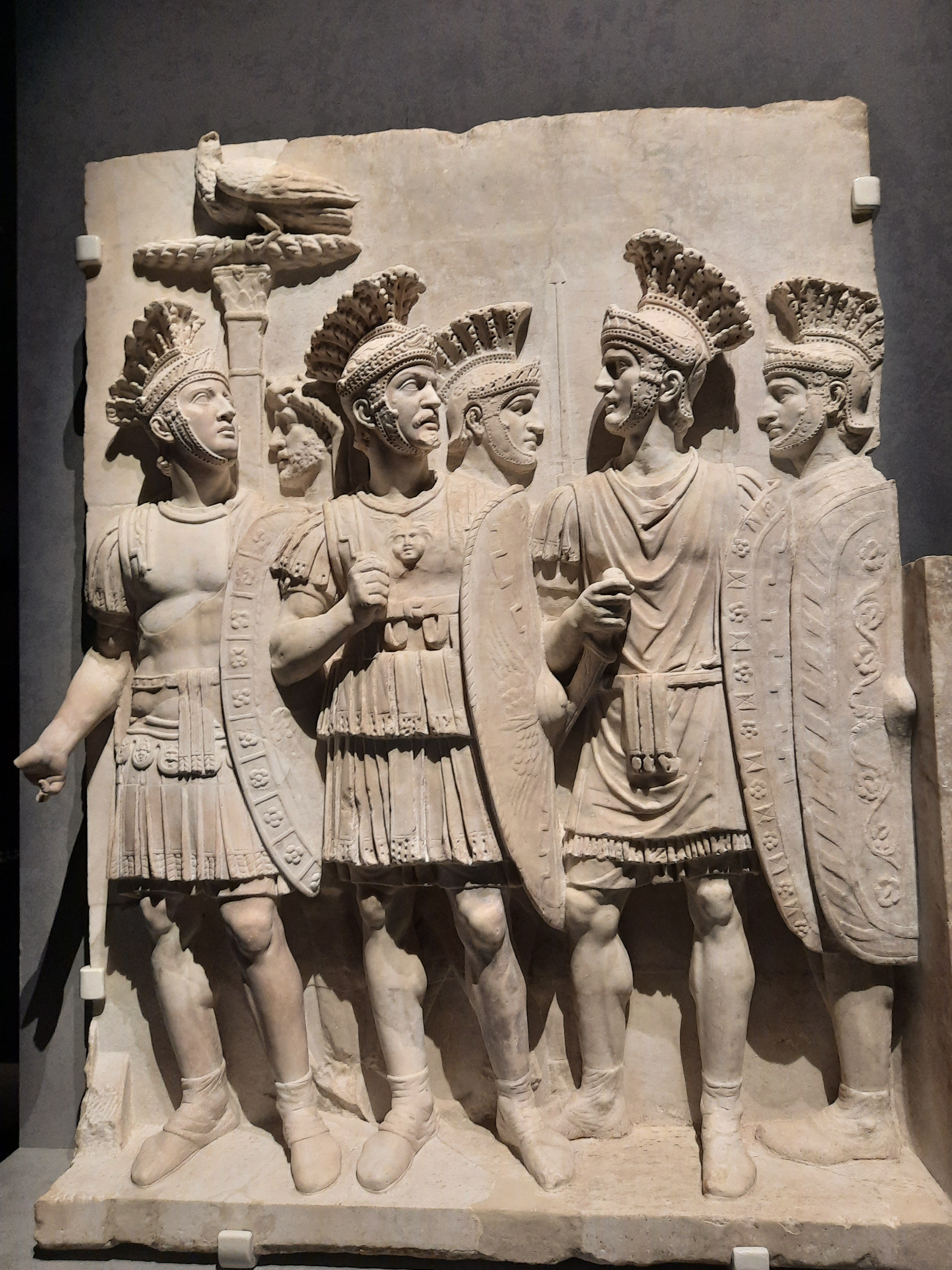
This relief depicts six Praetorians in parade armour. It comes from a triumphal arch in Rome that commemorated Claudius' conquest of Britain.

The Praetorian guard acted as the bodyguards of the emperor. The Praetorian guards were recruited from good family in the central Italian regions of Latium, Etruria and Umbria. During the reign of Augustus they were also recruited from the north of Italy. Throughout the first century AD, provincials from distant regions such as Thrace, Pannonia and Germania major were recruited into the cohorts too. Similar to legionaries, Praetorian guardsmen — whether milites (infantrymen), equites (cavalrymen) or speculatores (elite troops) — had to be Roman citizens. According to Herodian, Praetorians had to be tall. He describes them as megistoi, a Greek word meaning 'the biggest' or 'the greatest' (physically). Recruits typically enlisted between the ages of 17 and 20. Following the setting of the length of praetorian service at 12 years by Augustus in 13 BC, this was increased to 16 years 18 years later. Nevertheless, examples of praetorians retiring after 16 years are rare, even during the Augustan period or the reign of his successor, Tiberius (AD 14–37). Under Augustus there were nine praetorian cohorts each 500 strong. This number was increased to twelve, probably by Caligula,’ and Vitellius in the panic of the Civil War enrolled sixteen from legions loyal to himself, but Vespasian, with typical frugality, reduced the number once more to nine and the size to 500 each.

=== cohortes urbanae ===
The cohortes urbanae (urban cohorts) were a specialized paramilitary force in ancient Rome, primarily responsible for maintaining public order and security within the city of Rome and other major urban centers of the Roman Empire. They were established by Emperor Augustus in the late 1st century BCE as part of his efforts to reform and centralize the Roman military and administrative systems. The cohortes urbanae were distinct from both the regular legions of the army and the Praetorian Guard, occupying a unique role as an urban peacekeeping force.

=== Cavalry ===
The Roman heavy cavalry during the pax romana was a mix of units drawn from both Roman citizens and auxiliary forces recruited from allied or subjugated peoples. The primary heavy cavalry units included: Alae (Auxiliary Cavalry Wings), Equites Legionis (Legionary Cavalry) and Equites Cataphractarii (Armored Horsemen). Like the infantry cohorts, there were two sizes of ala, the ala quingenaria, (500 troops) and the ala milliaria (1000 troops). Each ala quingenaria consisted of sixteen squadrons (turmae) of 30 men. The ala milliaria made up of twenty-four turmae, which also consisted of 30 men. (Note: Contrary to what the names suggest, the ala militaria consisted of only 720 horsemen and the ala quingenaria of 480 men.) The turmae, like the centuries, will have been subdivided into contubernia, but the size of these is not known. An ala was commanded by a Praefectus Alae. This officer was often an equestrian-status Roman citizen with broad military experience. Below the Praefectus was the decurio and his second-in-command the duplicarius, in charge of a turma.

=== Immunes ===
Although the roman soldier was trained to perform most of the special task like bridge building or creating defence works there were also specialized units and individuals within the Roman military who were specifically trained and designated for certain technical or support roles. These specialists, often referred to as immunes, were exempt from regular duties such as digging ditches or standing guard, allowing them to focus on their particular expertise. While the average Roman soldier was capable of constructing fortifications, siege engines, or temporary bridges as part of their general training, the immunes provided the technical knowledge and oversight required for more complex projects.

Among the large group of immunes were Engineers (Architecti) and Artifices (Fabri): responsible for advanced construction tasks, such as building permanent bridges, aqueducts, and fortifications. They also designed and operated siege engines like ballistae, onagers, and battering rams during sieges. Their expertise was importante for large-scale engineering projects that went beyond the basic skills of the regular soldiers. Surveyors (Agrimensores) who were tasked with measuring and planning construction sites, including camps, roads, and fortifications. They used tools like the groma and chorobates to ensure precision in aligning roads or laying out military camps. Artillery Specialists (Ballistarii) who operated and maintained the army's siege engines, such as catapults and ballistae. Their training allowed them to calculate trajectories and ensure the proper functioning of the machinery during combat. Additional there were also Blacksmiths (Ferrarii) and Armorers (Armorum Custodes), Shipbuilders and Sailors (Classiarii): Clerks (Beneficiarii) and Administrators (Librarii), Animal Handlers (Muliones) and Medical Staff (Medici).

=== Auxilia ===
Auxiliary infantry regiments were designated as cohorts and were organised in a manner analogous to the organisation of the cohorts that constituted the legions. The majority of these regiments (cohortes quingenaria) comprised six centuries of 80 men each, totalling 480. However, some regiments (cohortes milliaria) consisted of ten centuries of 80 men, resulting in a total of 800, which was equivalent to the five double-strength centuries of the first cohort in the legion. As was the case with legionary centuries, the auxiliary centuries were subdivided into contubernia of 8 men each. Auxiliary units were normally commanded by men of equestrian rank, although their place was sometimes taken by centurions seconded from the legions. Cohortes quingenariae were commanded by a praefectus while cohortes milliariae were under the command of a tribune. Under the overall command of the prefectus or tribune in charge of each auxiliary unit were the centurions.

==== Cohors equitata ====
The cohortes equitatae were a type of mixed auxiliary unit in the Roman army that combined infantry (pedites) and cavalry (equites) within a single formation. Unlike the legions, which consisted solely of heavily armed Roman infantry, the cohortes equitatae were designed to provide greater tactical flexibility by combining the strengths of both infantry and cavalry in a single unit. A standard cohors equitata was typically organized into two primary types:

- Cohors equitata quingenaria: This smaller unit consisted of around 500 men, divided into:
  - 380 infantry (pedites).
  - 120 cavalry (equites), usually divided into four turmae .
- Cohors equitata milliaria: This larger unit had approximately 1,000 men, divided into:
  - 760 infantry.
  - 240 cavalry, organized into eight turmae.

Within these units, the cavalry and infantry worked closely together, with each group performing complementary roles during operations. The cohortes equitatae were versatile units that could perform a wide variety of tasks due to their combined arms structure. These units were often stationed in frontier provinces where they played a key role in securing borders against raids and incursions. They were well-suited to patrolling vast and varied terrains, such as forests, mountains, or deserts, where a mix of infantry and cavalry was necessary.

The cavalry component of the cohortes equitatae was used for scouting and gathering intelligence, as well as for harassing enemy forces during skirmishes. Their mobility allowed them to pursue fleeing enemies or attack enemy flanks during battles. The combined nature of these units meant they could quickly respond to threats. The cavalry could engage or delay an enemy force, while the infantry provided the staying power needed to hold ground or reinforce key positions. Cohortes equitatae were often tasked with escorting convoys, guarding supply lines, and maintaining order in the provinces. Their mobility and adaptability made them effective for peacekeeping and law enforcement. In larger military campaigns, these units often acted in support of the legions. The cavalry would scout ahead, screen the main force, or pursue retreating enemies, while the infantry served as light or medium troops to strengthen the Roman battle line when needed.

=== Naval Forces ===
Traditionally, the Roman Navy has been regarded as a subordinate military force, operating under the command and oversight of the Army. The fleets were typically under the command of a Praefectus, while a squadron was commanded by a Navachus. A single ship was under the command of a trierarchus, the exact relationship of the latter with the ship's centurion being unclear.The crew of a warship typically consisted of a contingent of soldiers (milites classiarii), armed sailors (nautae) – the seamen responsible for the technical duties of ship-handling but not excluded from combat – and oarsmen (remiges). Similarly to the army, the ship's centuria was under the command of a centurion, with an optio serving as his deputy. In addition, a beneficiarius oversaw a small administrative staff.

In the period under the rule of Augustus and Tiberius, the crews and commanders of ships were affiliated with the familia imperatoris, and their military organisation appears to have been in its nascent stages. It was only under Claudius that the naval forces were subjected to a more regular deployment. The most senior figures in the naval hierarchy under the Empire were the commanders of the two main Italian fleets, praefecti of equestrian rank who were directly responsible to the emperor. The subpraefects, who were often of equestrian rank and with some prior military experience, though not necessarily naval, were their immediate subordinates. The praefecti of the provincial fleets held a lower rank than their counterparts in the Italian fleets. Additionally, detached commands, also known as vexillationes, were a constituent element of a fleet. These were under the direct command of a praepositus, who was appointed by the fleet prefect.

Traditionally, the sailors were drawn from the lower classes of society, often being free men or peregrini. The Roman population never constituted an important maritime presence, and the few individuals of Italian origin are believed to have been of seafaring origin, most likely from the eastern Mediterranean. The duration of service was for a period of twenty-six years, which was one year longer than that of the auxiliaries. This is indicative of the fleet being regarded as a slightly inferior service. Upon discharge, citizenship was the reward bestowed upon the individual. In exceptional circumstances, entire crews may be granted immediate discharge in recognition of a particular act of gallantry. Additionally, there are instances where individuals are enlisted in the legion subsequent to their discharge. In contradistinction to the Army, naval officers were unable to aspire to promotion into another branch until the system was modified by Antoninus Pius.

== Recruitment and Training ==
=== Infantry ===
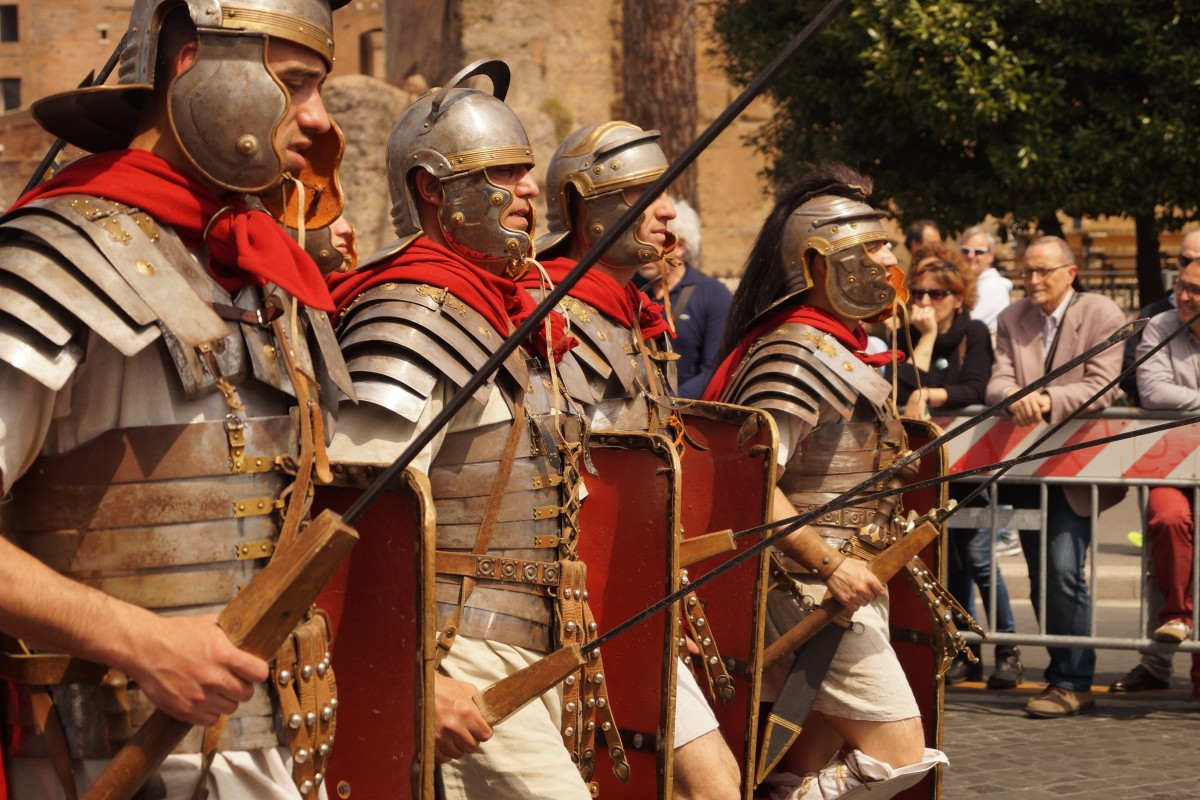
Depiction of Roman legionnaires

Men were rigorously selected to serve in the legions of the Roman Army. The primary qualifications for enlistment included sound health, a strong physique, and a minimum height of six Roman feet (equivalent to 5 feet 10 inches). Prospective recruits underwent a thorough medical examination. A young recruit was expected to have clear eyesight, hold his head high, possess a broad chest, muscular shoulders, long arms, a slim waist, and wiry legs and feet that were not overly fleshy. During the early Empire, there was little difficulty in securing enough recruits, especially from frontier zones where hardy and spirited young men were readily available.

The first step during recruitment was to confirm the recruit's legal status, which for service in the legions required full Roman citizenship. In frontier regions, this was sometimes a challenge, but it was addressed by granting immediate citizenship to recruits, with castris (the camp) recorded as their birthplace and enrollment into the Pollian tribe. Before officially joining the legions, recruits underwent a process to document any identifying marks, complete all legal formalities, and pass a series of fitness examinations. Once deemed fit, the recruit was required to take the sacramentum (oath of allegiance).

The oath was typically administered in groups. One recruit would be selected to raise his hand with an open palm and recite the full pledge, swearing to serve the Emperor and his appointed delegates, to obey all orders unto death, and to accept the severe punishments for desertion and disobedience. The remaining recruits would then take the oath individually, raising their hands and declaring idem in me ("the same for me"). After this, the recruit was officially recognized as a legionary, serving the Emperor, and was issued his viaticum (travel money) to journey to the unit where he was assigned. This concluded his probatio (probationary period).

Basic training for new recruits focused on physical fitness and discipline. Close-order drill was a pivotal component of the training, with the soldiers instructed to march in unison and maintain a cohesive formation. The legionaries were expected to march 20 Roman miles (18 miles) in five hours at the ordinary pace, loaded with a pack about 20.5 kg (451b) in weight and 24 miles in the same time at the quick step. Most of these exercises were undertaken with full kit, and in the case of the marches, frequently with packs and additional equipment.

Once the recruits had learned to march in unison and follow the commands of the trumpeters and flag bearers, they began their tactical training. A variety of formations were practised, including the hollow square, wedge, circle and the testudo, a mobile formation entirely protected by a roof and walls of shields. Their training encompassed a range of competencies, including the ability to overcome obstacles, execute tactical manoeuvres such as charging and breaking off combat, and adjust formations to facilitate the relief of engaged units and execute surprise attacks.

Weaponstraining followed the system employed at gladiatorial schools. A 6-ft (1.82-m) post was erected and the recruit was instructed in the art of fencing by means of striking the post with blows. His weaponry consisted of a wooden sword and a wicker shield, both of standard dimensions but more substantial than their historical counterparts. Consequently, as he engaged in the practice of the regulation cuts, thrusts and parries, the use of heavy equipment also contributed to the strengthening of his arms. It is also thought that the pila was thrown, with the stake serving as a target, and that a basic instruction in the use of other weapons, including slings, bows and various types of artillery, took place. Their training culminated in a demonstration of their capabilities before senior officers. Only after passing this evaluation were they fully accepted into the ranks of the legion as competent legionaries. During the reign of Augustus the time of service was sixteen years followed by a further four years in reserve. In A.D. 5 the service requirement was further increased, to a minimum of twenty years, plus five in reserve.

=== Cavalry ===
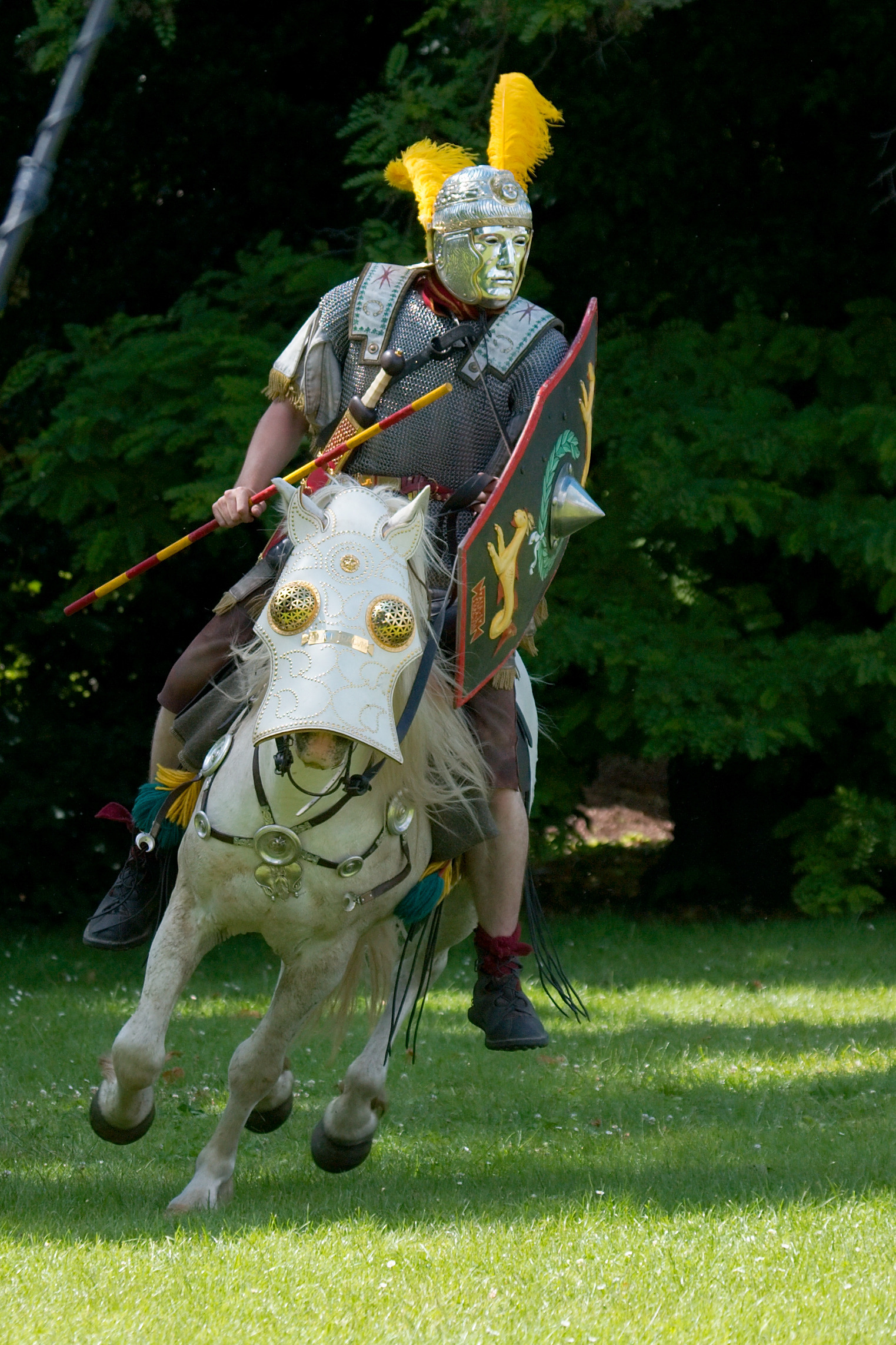
Roman cavalry reenactment show during "Römerfest 2008" in Carnuntum.

Training for the Roman cavalry was designed to ensure both troopers and their mounts were prepared for the demands of combat, including riding, weapon handling, and performing complex maneuvers under different conditions. Many recruits in the alae (auxiliary cavalry units) were already experienced horsemen due to their native backgrounds, especially those from regions with strong equestrian traditions like Gaul and Thrace. However, newly recruited cavalrymen, especially those promoted from infantry (cohortes equitatae), often had to be trained from scratch.

The basic training consisted of: Mounting wooden horses without any equipment to practice getting on and off from either side. Progressing to mounting while fully armed, sometimes on moving horses even with a drawn sword (spatha). Recruits were first taught proper posture and how to sit correctly on a horse. Xenophon, an ancient expert on horsemanship, advised to keep the lower leg relaxed, the body loose, and moving with the horse to avoid fatigue and maintain balance. Once recruits mastered sitting and basic riding, they moved on to controlling their horses using reins, legs, and voice commands. Horses were trained separately before being assigned to a rider.

Training began at the age of three and was conducted by experienced trainers who used long-reins to control the horse while teaching obedience and discipline. Horses were gradually introduced to carrying weight, including a rider, and were trained to perform battle maneuvers such as sharp turns, sudden stops, quick accelerations, and navigating rough terrain. Horses also underwent "war training" to prepare for the physical challenges of combat, including jumping over ditches, leaping walls, and galloping up and down hills. Once the horse and rider were paired, training became more intensive. Both were exercised together to develop coordination and synchronization. Under Emperor Hadrian, additional techniques were adopted from Celtic and Sarmatian cavalry, such as half- and quarter-turns, as well as advanced missile-handling skills.

Riders practiced throwing javelins at targets while galloping and defending themselves simultaneously. Cavalrymen were encouraged to engage in mock combat with blunted weapons to simulate real battle conditions. For example, two riders would practice a chase where one fled while the other pursued, trying to hit him with a blunt javelin. Horses and riders underwent regular cross-country rides to build stamina and adjust to different terrains. Routine training included long marches of 20 miles three times a month, during which cavalry practiced maneuvers under the supervision of their decuriones.

Advanced training culminated in the hippika gymnasia, or cavalry games, which served as both training and public demonstrations. These included: Mock charges and defenses between two opposing cavalry units. Precision drills involving throwing dummy javelins at gallop speed while defending against attacks. Demonstrations of exceptional skill, such as shooting arrows mid-air or swimming rivers while maintaining formation.

== Uniforms ==
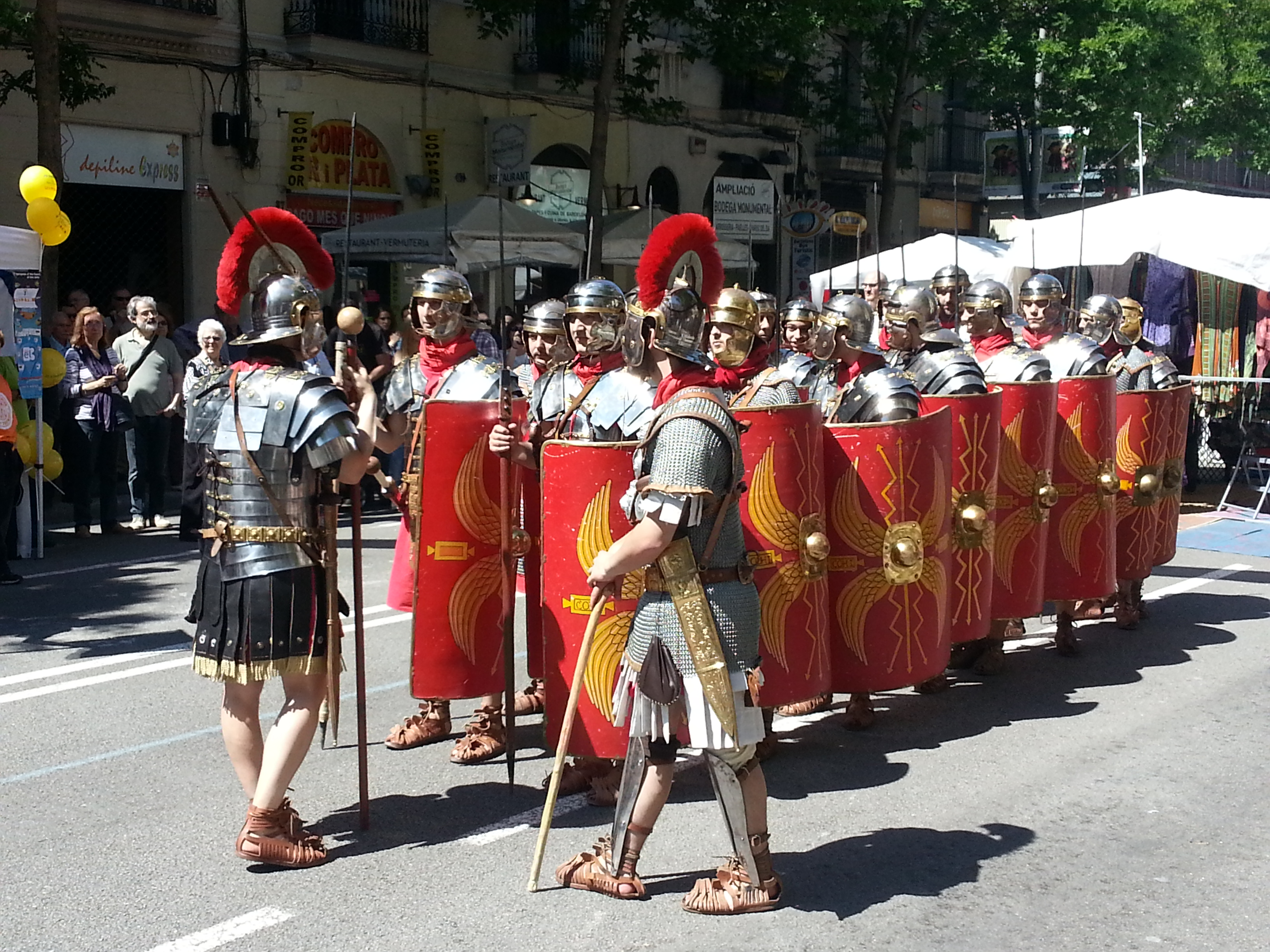
reenactment of a roman cohort

The basic clothing of a Roman soldier consisted of a short, woolen tunic that usually fell above the knees, dyed in natural or reddish-brown hues. Beneath this, soldiers wore a linen undergarment for comfort. A leather belt (cingulum militare), often decorated with metal studs or plates, was worn around the waist to secure the tunic and as a symbol of military identity. Attached to the belt were straps or pendants (balteus), which often had decorative purposes as well. Soldiers wore short breeches (bracae) in colder climates, particularly in northern provinces such as Britain or Germania.

The armor worn by Roman soldiers during the Pax Romana varied depending on the period and rank. The most worn armor of the early Pax Romana was the lorica segmentata, a type of articulated plate armor made of iron strips fastened together with leather straps. This armor provided excellent protection and flexibility while being relatively lightweight. Earlier in the Republic and in some provincial forces, the lorica hamata (chainmail) was common, made of interlocking iron rings that offered durability and ease of repair. The lorica hamata continued to be used alongside the lorica segmentata, particularly by centurions and auxiliary troops. By the late 2nd and early 3rd centuries CE, the lorica squamata (scale armor) became in use, especially among officers. On their feet they wore the caligae heavy sandals with several thicknesses of sole studded with hollow-headed hob nails. The leather thongs were continued half-way up the shin and tied there. When in cold climate they were stuffed with wool or fur.

For additional protection, soldiers wore a helmet (galea), typically made of iron or bronze. Early imperial helmets, such as the Coolus and Montefortino types, were gradually replaced by the Imperial Gallic and Imperial Italic helmets. These helmets featured reinforced cheek guards, a neck guard, and a brow plate to offer superior protection in combat. Helmets were often adorned with crests, particularly for centurions and officers, who used transverse crests to signify their rank.

In general, fighting sailors (nautae) and embarked troops were slightly better dressed than regular infantry, with clothing reinforced to withstand wear and tear from salt water. Different climates obviously required different clothing: for example, the nautae Parisiaci are depicted wearing heavy cloaks of the paenula or lacerna type, whereas the sailors of the Danube Fleet wear the typical short-sleeved or sleeveless tunic with a bunched, knotted neck. This tunic was worn like a Greek exomis, leaving the right shoulder uncovered. It was a practical garment for manual workers, soldiers, sailors and fishermen. They also wore fasciae roman puttees and byrrus castalinus a short cloak. (Note: While the meaning of the adjective 'castalinus' is unclear, it may be an alternative spelling of 'castorinus', meaning 'beaver-furred', which would be a reasonable description for a garment worn at sea.)

== Ranks ==
=== Land Forces ===
==== Senior Command ====
- Imperator Equivalent: Commander-in-Chief
- Legatus Augusti pro Praetore Equivalent: General or Military Governor
- Legatus Legionis Equivalent: Major General
- Tribunus Laticlavius

==== Mid-Level Officers ====
- Praefectus Castrorum Equivalent: Major
- Tribuni Angusticlavii Equivalent: Lieutenant Colonel

==== Centurion Ranks ====
- Primus Pilus Equivalent: Captain
- Centurio Equivalent: First lieutenant
- Optio Equivalent: Sergeant Major
- Tesserarius Equivalent: Sergeant
- Signifer Equivalent: Colonel
- Cornicen
- Imaginifer
- Aquilifer Equivalent: Colonel

==== Enlisted Ranks ====
- Miles Equivalent: Private

=== Auxiliary Forces ===
- Praefectus Cohortis
- Praefectus Alae
- Decurio Equivalent: Second Lieutenant
- Centurio Auxiliaris Equivalent: First lieutenant
- Eques Equivalent: horseman
- Pedes Equivalent: Private

=== Naval Forces (Classis) ===
- Praefectus Classis Equivalent: Admiral
- Navarch Equivalent: Commodore
- Trierarchus Equivalent: Captain
- Centurio Classiarius No Equivalent
- Remiges Equivalent: Sailor or Oarsman
- Classiarius Equivalent: Marine

== Pay ==
Until the late first century, the salary of legionaries was nine aurei, paid in three instalments per year. This sum was increased by Domitian to twelve aurei, by the addition of a fourth instalment. This remained the standard rate of pay until Severus made a further increase. In reality, only a proportion of this money was ever received by the soldier; the rest was deducted for compulsory expenditures on clothing, footwear, nourishment, and so forth. Should the individual be in a position to make such savings, they would be credited to their savings account, along with any remaining funds from their vacatus, or journey money. This was the sum of three aurei, equivalent to four or, after the increase under Domitian, three months' pay, made over to the recruit on enlistment to reimburse him for travel expenses from home. The savings of the legionaries would, like the savings of their colleagues in the auxiliary units, be deposited ad signa, that is in the shrine of the regimental standards. In this context, the savings of the men would be held in trust for them by the signiferi, who function as the standard-bearers of his unit.

Occasionally there were bounties and gifts, and the legionaries also received considerable benefits in the form of money or land when they were discharged. Around 5 AD the amount was 3000 denarii, and by the end of the pax romana it had risen to 5000 denarii. Usually the piece of land a soldier received was 20 by 20 actus (603 square yards).This sum only covered the monetary grant for areas where the land had been obtained through conquest or purchased at a low price.

In the higher ranks of the legion, the financial remuneration was calculated at a rate that was one-and-a-half to two times the amount received by the lowest-ranking member. A cornicen received 500 denarii, while the liberarii and exacti received 800 denarii. The cornicularius praefecti received 1,000 denarii, while the optio ad spem ordinis received 1,500 denarii. The exact amounts of pay received by officers within the Legion remain unclear. However, it appears that it was at least five times the amount typically received by common soldiers.

A significant benefit of the centurion's role was the authority to impose fees for exemption from fatigue duty. Otho sought to rectify this imbalance by allocating a grant from the treasury that was equivalent to the deficit, thereby aiming to augment the remuneration of centurions. The primi ordines are presumed to have received a pay that was double that of ordinary centurions, and the primus pilus received a pay that was twice as much again. All financial incentives, including bounties, donations and discharge grants, would be allocated in proportion to the specific circumstances of each case. Upon discharge, a primus pilus would have received a sufficient amount to acquire equestrian status, which is defined as a property qualification of 400,000 sestertii.Praetorians earned three times the basic legionary rate Praetorian officers were presumably paid three times the rates of equivalent ranks in the legions. Praetorians received a lump sum on retirement, almost twice the amount given to legionaries who had completed more stipendia. Like other Roman soldiers, Pretorians were subject to deductions from pay.

The pay for auxiliary troops in the Roman military varied depending on their role, unit type, and rank. Cavalrymen (equites) received higher pay than infantrymen (pedites), and a transfer from the infantry to the cavalry section of a cohors equitata (a mixed infantry and cavalry cohort) was considered a promotion. Soldiers in an ala (a purely cavalry unit) earned even higher wages than the cavalrymen of a mixed cohort, indicating a hierarchy of pay within the cavalry branch. Certain ranks, such as principales (junior officers) and those in specific junior posts, were entitled to enhanced pay. These included sesquiplicarii, who received pay-and-a-half, and duplicarii, who earned double pay.

The exact amount of basic pay for auxiliary troops remains uncertain, and there is ongoing debate among historians about whether non-citizen auxiliary infantry received the same salary as legionaries or were paid less. One proposition suggests that the sesquiplicarius may have earned the equivalent of a legionary's pay, while a duplicarius in an ala earned more. Under Emperor Domitian, it is estimated that a cavalryman in a mixed cohort earned approximately 200 denarii annually, while an infantryman in the auxilia earned around 100 denarii. This pay structure shows the differentiation in roles and responsibilities among Roman auxiliary troops, with higher pay awarded to those in cavalry units, specialized roles, or positions of greater authority.

== Religion ==
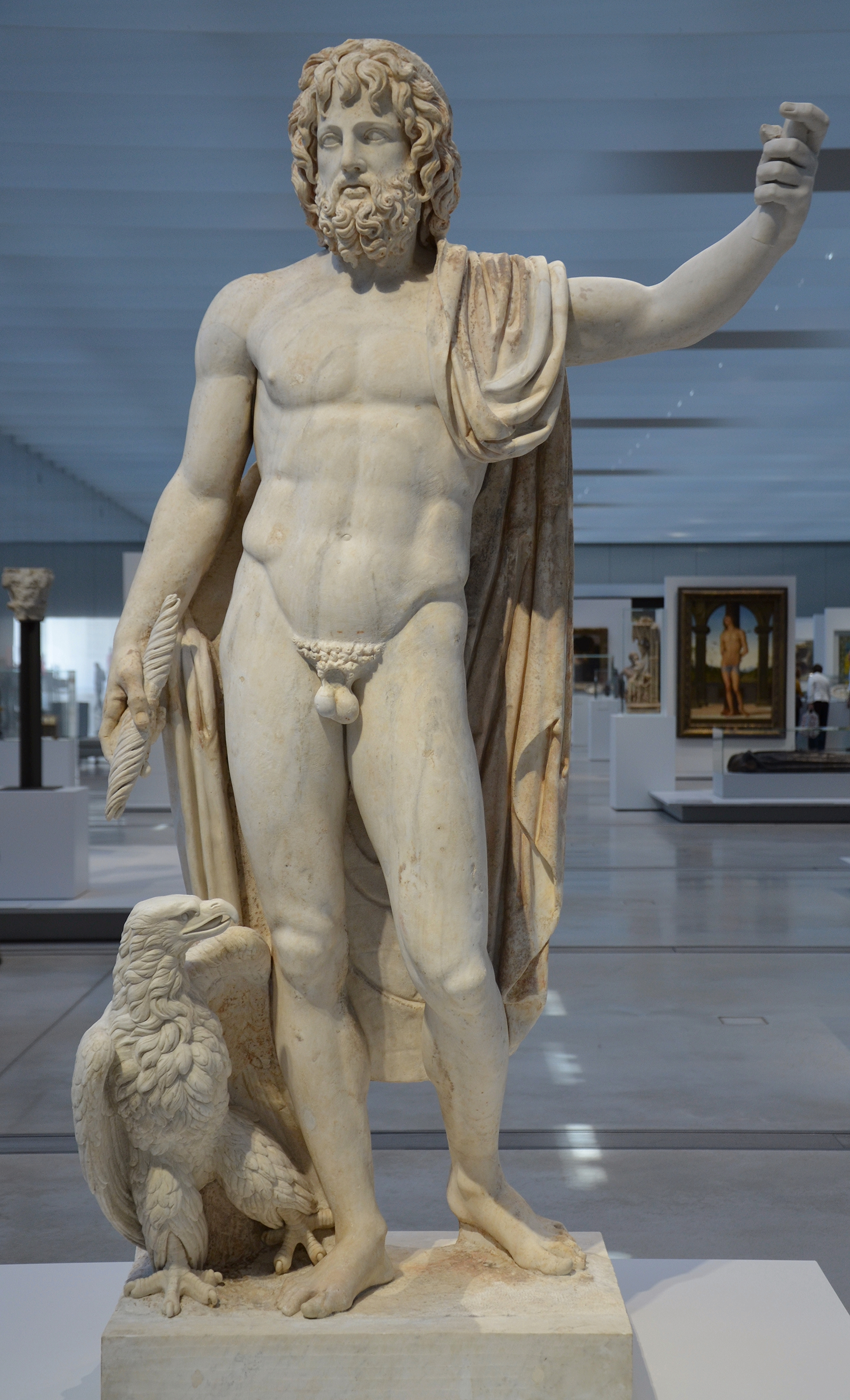
Statue of Jupiter bringing lightning and accompanied by an eagle, made around 150 AD, from Rome (Italy), Louvre Lens, France

The religion of the Roman army was a complex and multifaceted aspect of its identity, reflecting the broader religious practices of Roman society while also adapting to the unique context of military life. In the Roman world, religion was not merely a private or personal matter but an essential element of public and communal life. This principle extended into the army, where religious practices were deeply intertwined with discipline, morale, and the collective identity of the soldiers. The Roman army was a microcosm of the empire, drawing recruits from across its vast territories. As a result, its religious practices were diverse, encompassing both traditional Roman rituals and the beliefs of the varied cultures within the empire. At its core, however, Roman military religion centered on the worship of state and military deities, ensuring the favor of the gods for success in battle and the safety of the empire. Chief among these deities was Jupiter, the supreme god of the Roman pantheon, whose protection was sought before campaigns and battles. Mars, the god of war, was also a central figure in military worship, embodying the strength and valor required on the battlefield.

The military standards, or signa, carried by Roman legions were also imbued with religious meaning. These standards were more than just practical tools for organization on the battlefield; they were sacred objects, often dedicated to specific deities. The eagle standard (aquila) of a legion, for instance, was a powerful symbol of the unit's identity and divine protection. The care and reverence with which these standards were treated was a result of the soldiers' belief in their spiritual value. The celebration of official religion in the Roman army was a structured and collective practice that combined the worship of traditional Roman deities with rituals designed to ensure divine favor, discipline, and unity among the soldiers. Religion in the military was not only a matter of personal belief but an institutionalized practice, deeply embedded in the routines and operations of the army. It played a crucial role in maintaining morale and strengthening loyalty both to the gods and to the emperor, who was often venerated as a divine or semi-divine figure.

The army also celebrated official religious festivals (festi) that aligned with the broader Roman calendar. These festivals often featured communal feasts, games, and processions, providing soldiers with a sense of connection to the civilian population of Rome, even when stationed far from the city. For example, festivals dedicated to Mars, the god of war, were especially important for the army. Mars was regarded as the protector of soldiers, and his favor was sought through prayers and offerings to ensure success in battle. Religious observances were not limited to large-scale events. Daily rituals were performed at the level of individual units, further reinforcing the role of religion in military life. Each legion had its own shrine (sacellum) where the standards of the legion were kept. These standards, particularly the aquila (eagle standard), were considered sacred objects and symbols of the legion's identity and divine protection. Soldiers made offerings and prayers at these shrines, treating the standards with deep reverence. Losing a standard in battle was seen as a military failure as well as a grave religious offense.

The emperor, as the head of state and a figure of divine authority, was a central focus of military religion. Soldiers were required to swear oaths of loyalty to the emperor, and this act carried religious significance. The emperor's image was often displayed in military camps and included in rituals, symbolizing the link between the army and the divine order upheld by the emperor. Over time, the imperial cult became an integral part of military religious practice, with soldiers participating in ceremonies that honored the emperor as a god or as a representative of the gods.

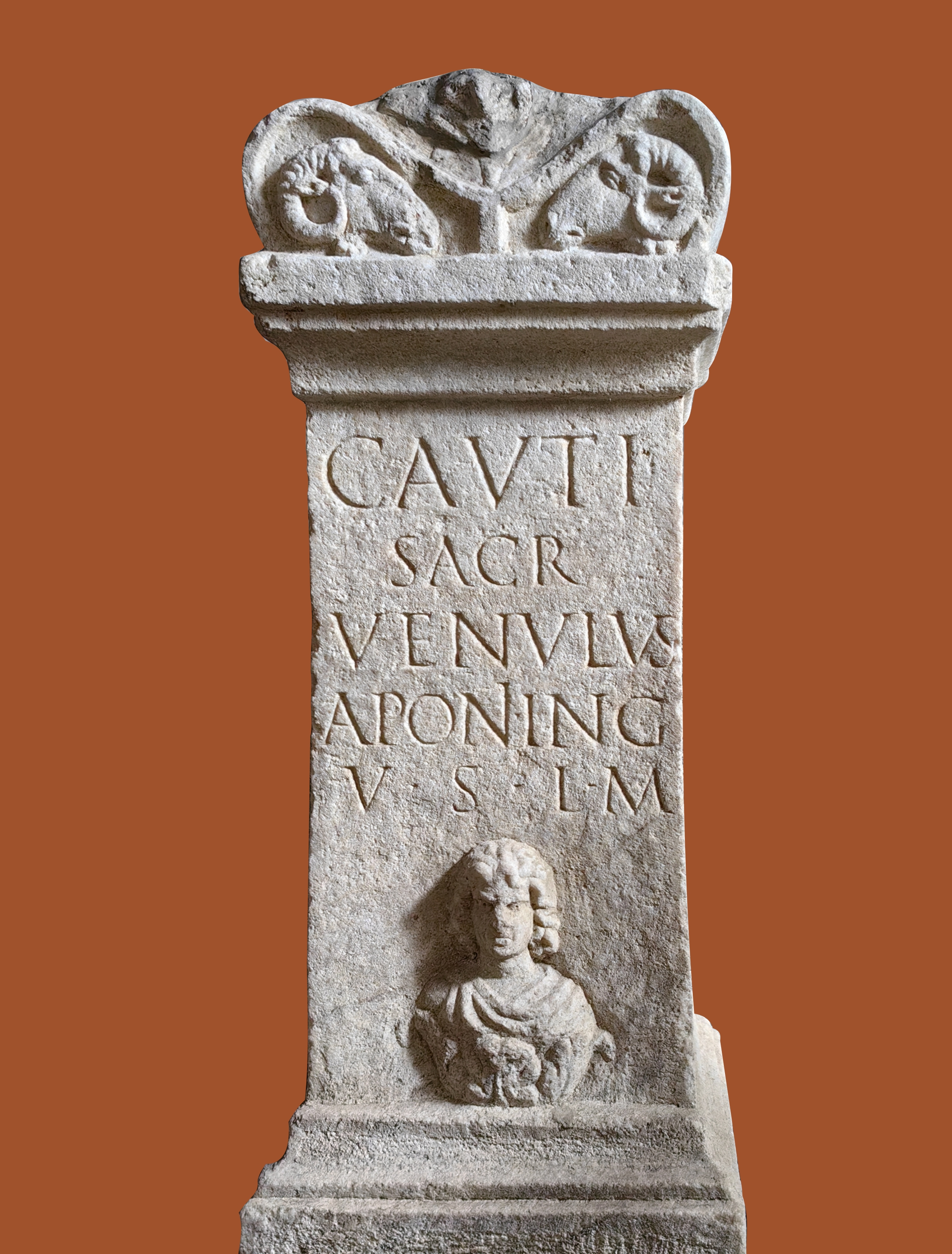
Sacrificial altar, dedicated to Cautes, one of the two companions (torch bearers) of Mithras.

Beyond the official state-sponsored religious practices, soldiers often turned to non-official and foreign cults. These religions, many of which originated in the eastern provinces of the empire, flourished within the military environment, where men from diverse cultural backgrounds lived and served side by side. One of the most prominent cult in the Roman army was the worship of Mithras, a god of Persian origin whose mysteries gained widespread popularity among soldiers. Mithraism, often referred to as the "Mysteries of Mithras," centered on the god Mithras, who was depicted as a heroic figure slaying a cosmic bull in a symbolic act of creation and renewal. The appeal of Mithraism to soldiers lay in its Importance on loyalty, brotherhood, and the struggle between light and darkness—values that resonated deeply with the military ethos. Mithraic worship took place in underground sanctuaries called mithraea, which were often built near military camps. These sanctuaries were private and intimate spaces, where initiates participated in secretive rituals, including banquets and symbolic rites of passage. Mithraism also fostered a sense of community among its adherents, establishing a spiritual bond that transcended ranks and cultural differences within the army.

Another influence in the Roman army came from Zoroastrianism, the ancient Persian religion that preceded and influenced Mithraism. While Zoroastrianism itself did not take root among Roman soldiers as a formal cult, its dualistic worldview—emphasizing the cosmic battle between the forces of good (Ahura Mazda) and evil (Angra Mainyu)—found echoes in the beliefs and practices of Mithraic worship. The Zoroastrian belief that fire is sacred may also have influenced the rituals of Roman soldiers, particularly in eastern provinces where Persian culture was still strong. The worship of Egyptian gods also played a significant role in the spiritual lives of Roman soldiers, particularly those stationed in or near Egypt. The Egyptian goddess Isis, associated with protection, healing, and the promise of eternal life, was especially popular. Her cult transcended social and geographical boundaries, offering a deeply personal and emotional form of worship. Rituals dedicated to Isis often involved processions, music, and offerings, creating a vibrant and theatrical form of devotion that appealed to soldiers seeking solace or protection in the uncertainty of military life.

A particularly example of religious syncretism in the Roman army was the worship of Zeus-Serapis, a fusion of the Greek god Zeus and the Egyptian god Serapis. This hybrid deity combined the supreme authority of Zeus with the mystical and salvific aspects of Serapis, creating a figure that resonated with the multicultural identity of the Roman Empire. Soldiers who worshiped Zeus-Serapis often sought his protection as a universal god who embodied both power and benevolence. His temples and altars were found throughout the empire, especially in regions where Greek and Egyptian cultures intersected. In addition to these major cults, the Roman army also embraced a variety of minor and regional deities, due to the diverse origins of its soldiers. For example, Celtic gods from Gaul or Britannia, such as Epona, the goddess of horses, were worshiped by cavalry units. In regions influenced by Anatolian culture, the worship of the Phrygian Mother Goddess Cybele and her consort Attis also found followers among soldiers. These regional gods and goddesses were often honored at small altars or shrines within military camps, where soldiers could perform personal rituals and offer sacrifices.

== Promotion ==
Promotion in the early Roman imperial army was based on a combination of merit, seniority, and patronage. The Roman army was a highly disciplined and organized institution, and promotion was a sign of a soldier's competence, loyalty, and ability to lead. Soldiers who demonstrated exceptional bravery or skill in battle were often rewarded with advancement, showing the importance of merit. Seniority also played a key role, as soldiers who served faithfully for many years could gradually rise through the ranks, provided they proved their competence and reliability. However, personal connections and patronage were also factors in the promotion process. Soldiers with influential patrons or the favor of their commanding officers could advance more rapidly. Specialized skills, such as engineering or logistical expertise, could also lead to promotions, as the army valued practical abilities that contributed to its operations.

The Roman military hierarchy provided a structured career path, with soldiers aspiring to rise from the rank of common legionary (miles) to positions such as centurion or even primus pilus, the senior centurion of a legion. Exceptional individuals might rise even further, attaining equestrian status and commanding auxiliary cohorts or legions. While merit and performance were central ideals in the promotion process, Politics, favoritism, and the influence of commanding officers often had an important role in determining a soldier's career progression. Thus, promotion in the Roman army was shaped by a combination of institutional structure, personal ability, and the dynamics of Roman society.

The career path for officers of equestrian status typically progressed through three main stages: praefectus cohortis (commander of an infantry or cavalry cohort), tribunus legionis angusticlavius (a junior legionary tribune), and finally praefectus alae (commander of an auxiliary cavalry wing). For individuals who achieved equestrian status later in life, these terms of office generally lasted three to four years each and were often sufficient to complete their careers. However, younger equestrians with the right connections and abilities could rise further, potentially attaining senatorial rank. These officers primarily held administrative and judicial responsibilities rather than direct command roles.

Centurions, who were the most responsible officers in the legions, rose through a different system. Entry into the centurionate was generally possible after at least twelve years of service, though exceptional martial skills and leadership abilities could shorten this period. Literacy was a crucial prerequisite, as it allowed soldiers to work in positions such as scribes (librarii), which often led to promotion. Recruits who demonstrated literacy and administrative aptitude were quickly identified and assigned to headquarters staff, where they gained valuable experience and established connections with senior officers, particularly tribunes, who could act as patrons. In addition to promotion from the ranks, direct entry into the centurionate was possible for civilians, particularly the sons of centurions or those with strong patronage.

The centurionate itself was highly structured, with sixty centurions in each legion ranked by seniority. The pace of promotion corresponded to the main ways of how a centurion had received their commissions. Having received commission either by ex equite Romano, or as evocati promotion were rapidly. Promotion was conducted on a cohort-by-cohort basis, as was customary under the Republic. However, a centurion's rank (i.e. pilus, princeps, or hastatus) remained subject to alteration with each promotion. It was imperative that each step in his career was a definitive promotion. If he was a man of marked ability, he might bypass the customary intermediate stages and expeditiously enter the primi ordines, thereby attaining the coveted post of primus pilus.

Conversely, the ranker advanced gradually and made only limited progress in the promotion hierarchy. The subject's initial rank was decimus hastatus posterior, which was followed by successive promotions within the tenth cohort. These promotions involved an elevation in rank from decimus hastatus posterior to decimus hastatus prior, and so forth, until he attained the rank of decimus pilus posterior. The subsequent manoeuvre was to nonus hastatus posterior; for decimus pilus prior being one of the primi ordines was reserved for the marked man as a step to the post of primus pilus (chief centurion).

The position of aprimus pilus was typically held for one year. This rank was highly prestigious and well-paid, often providing a sufficient grant upon discharge to acquire equestrian status. Centurions who reached this level could continue serving in the army or pursue civil service roles, such as provincial procuratorships. The praefectus castrorum (camp prefect), who was usually a former primus pilus, ranked third in command within the legion and was responsible for logistics, fort maintenance, and supplies. This position was often the peak of a career for men who had spent their entire lives in the army, typically reaching it in their fifties or sixties.

Promotion below the centurionate followed a carefully designed training system. Soldiers advanced through positions such as librarius (clerk), tesserarius (guard commander), optio (deputy centurion), and signifer (standard bearer). Only those who reached the higher ranks, such as cornicularius (office manager) or optio ad spem ordinis (deputy centurion awaiting promotion to the centurionate), could expect to advance to centurion. Promotion through the ranks required not just excellence in leadership and administration but also the favor of a patron, which was essential at every stage of advancement. In some cases, promotion was accelerated by special circumstances, such as demonstrating loyalty during civil wars, which could lead to rapid advancement.

== Living conditions ==
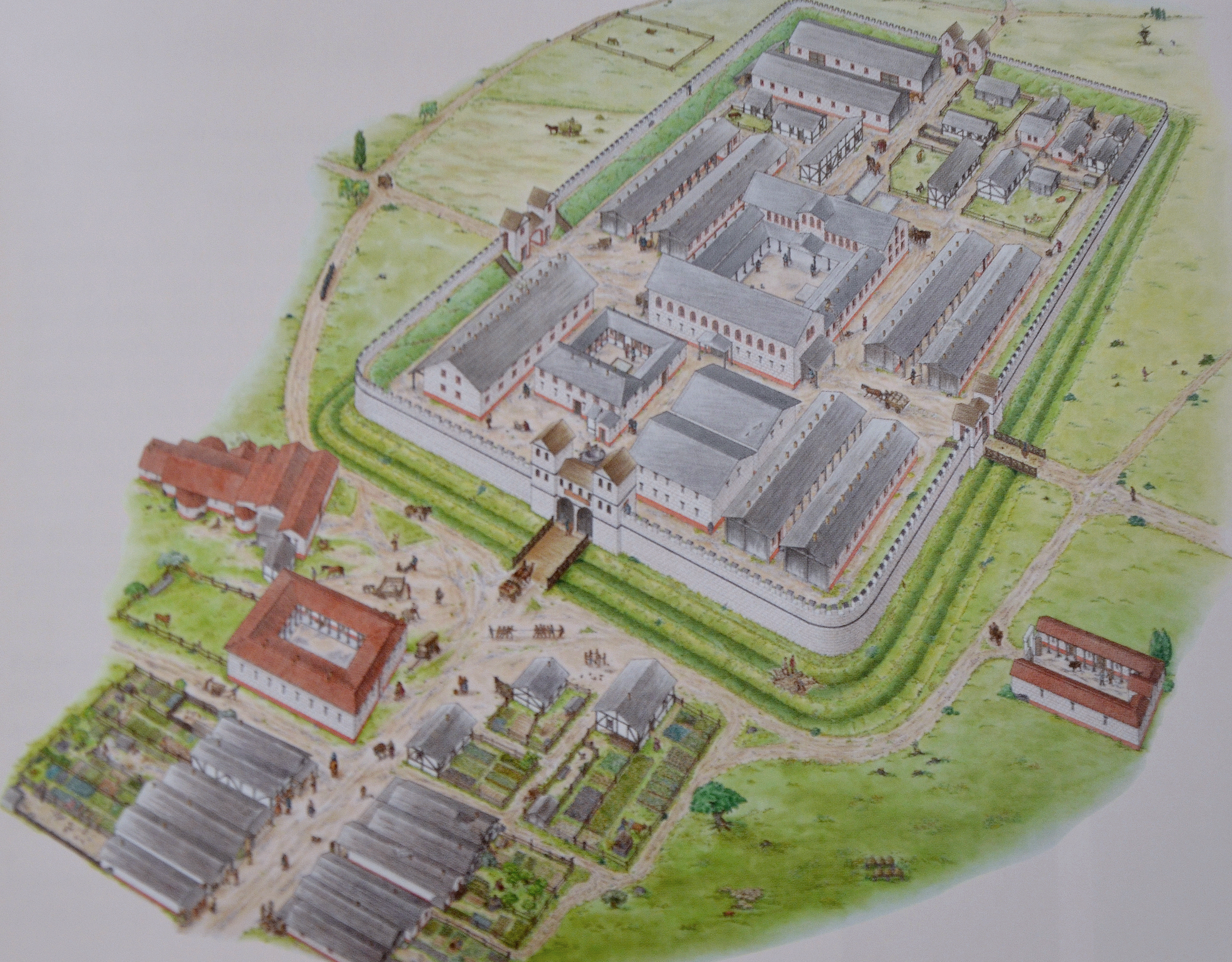
Reconstruction drawing of the Roman Fort Saalburg in Hesse Germany

A substantial proportion of a soldier's life was spent in barracks, and it is worthwhile to consider this environment in greater detail. For conscripts hailing from urban areas, life in a densely populated military base will not have been wholly alien. It is reasonable to hypothesise that the men from rural areas, in particular the numerous auxiliaries hailing from less settled provinces, would have perceived the city as a novel and unfamiliar location. During the reign of Augustus, the army assumed a new permanence, and while expansion continued, many legions began to remain in the same region of a province for extended periods. In the course of time, the original winter quarters underwent a process of evolution, transforming into more permanent bases. These new bases subsequently functioned as the legion's depot, serving as a repository for the majority of its records and administrative functions, even during periods when the bulk of the unit was engaged in campaigning activities.

Initially, such bases were merely slightly more substantial constructions than winter camps (castra hiberna), with timber buildings and earth ramparts. However, over time, these were rebuilt in a more substantial form. Subsequently, the use of tiled roofs superseded thatching, and stone became the primary material for construction, replacing wooden walls. Stone reconstruction was usually carried out in phases, with the selection of buildings depending on the unit's immediate priorities. The rate of this process was dictated by the condition of the extant timber structures and the local availability of suitable masonry.

A legionary fortress (castra) encompassed an area of approximately 50-60 acres (20-25 ha). Defence was rarely a primary consideration when legionary fortresses were established. The importance of ensuring access to efficient road and water-based communication systems was paramount for the functionality of these military installations. Consequently, the majority of these bases were strategically situated in proximity to navigable rivers. While there is some variation in the earliest period, almost all fortresses conform to the classic playing card shape — a rectangle with rounded corners — common to marching camps.

In the context of the layout of Roman bases, two roads were of particular significance. The primary, or via principalis, traversed the length of each of the fort's primary sides, connecting the gateway at its extremities. At right angles to this was the via praetoria, which led from the most important gate of the camp, the porta praetoria, up to the headquarters building, or principia, which lay behind the via principia. It is evident that there were other roads within the fortress, the most notable of which was the via decumana. This road led from beyond the range of buildings surrounding the principia out to the porta decumana gate in the rear wall.

Roman soldiers were assigned various tasks, including guard duty at the principia, fortress gates, and patrols. Two men spent a day with the artillery, possibly training or cleaning weapons and ammunition. Fatigues included being assigned to the bath house, cleaning out latrines, and assisting in its maintenance. Some men were assigned to 'boots', which involved looking after their own kit or repairing the century's footwear. The centurion's boots were probably used as beaters, and the men “in the century” were at the immediate disposal of the centurion and the principales.

Whilst in camp the century have done little or nothing as a unit. The men were assigned as individuals to wherever they were required. Initially, there were 31 available soldiers for duty but this was later increased to 35. The remaining nine soldiers were immunes or exempt from normal duties. Some soldiers bribed their centurions to avoid disagreeable duties, which was detrimental to discipline. Despite this, the problem of bribery remains unresolved. Although soldiers spent much of their time assigned as individuals to specific tasks, the corporate life of the unit continued. The day began with a muster parade, where orders were delivered by a senior officer. Men were then sent to their tasks, and other parades occurred after which they were enrolled as sick or returned to normal duties. Guards throughout the camp were changed, and a new password for the day was issued, likely involving significant ceremony.

Parades were held on certain days to commemorate important events, with military events being rare. The Severi festival was an important event, aimed at reminding soldiers of their loyalty. Deified emperors like Augustus, Claudius, and Trajan were also remembered, along with Julius Caesar and Germanicus, the grandson of Augustus. Most occasions required a formal parade of the unit, usually accompanied by a sacrifice of bulls, cows, or oxen. The sacrificial meat was eaten, as seen during Titus's celebration of Jerusalem's capture in AD 70. These festivals were likely to be followed by feasting, where the sacrificial meat was eaten.

=== Diet ===
During a campaign, it was absolutely vital for Roman commanders to keep their army supplied with everything they needed. Providing for the army in its garrisons required considerable effort, even in peacetime. The cost of food was a standard deduction from a soldier's pay. It was vital that proper rations were issued to ensure the morale of the army, its health and efficiency. One of the fundamental components of the military diet was corn (frumentum). A great proportion of the rations were distributed in an uncooked state. Individual rations were issued to soldiers, who then prepared them in contuberniums, either in ovens set into the fortress walls or built into the barrack blocks. The army's daily diet comprised two principal meals: breakfast (prandium) in the morning and dinner (cena) at the end of the day. The grain ration was typically distributed in its fundamental form, although during military campaigns it might be provided in the form of hard-tack biscuits (bucellatum). These biscuits were then ground by the soldiers into flour.

The provision of grain was secured either from civilian sources and from land owned, or leased, by the army itself. In contrast to the general impression roman soldiers were not vegetarian. Along with lentils, onions, radishes, cabbages and other vegetables pork, beef, sheep and goat were part of their diet. Other items were Garum, pork fat, spices, a large variety of fruits and nuts salt, vintage wine (vinum), sour wine (acetum) and Celtic beer (cervesa). Apart from purchase, additional food could be supplied by hunting and there is considerable evidence for soldiers indulging in this. Deer, especially red and roe dear and elk, were commonly hunted for food as well as sport in the northern provinces. The rations issued by the army appear in general to have been adequate, if inclined to be somewhat monotonous, and were evidently often supplemented by private purchases.

=== Hygiene and Health ===
It was essential for the army to maintain the good health and fitness of its soldiers in order to remain effective. Roman bases and temporary camps were built in the healthiest locations possible. In order to keep the soldiers clean, bath houses were built, and drains and latrines were installed to ensure reasonable standards of hygiene. Men sat on wooden seats above stone lavatories; the waste dropped into a drain that was constantly flushed with flowing water. Other channels of flowing water were provided for washing the sponges that the Romans used instead of toilet paper.

In some cases, temporary encampments may have consisted of a substantial tented hospital, typically arranged in a square configuration around a central open area. This design was largely retained in the permanent structures of subsequent fortifications. Notwithstanding the absence of a large-scale campaign, it appears that the base hospitals were frequently occupied. A variety of medical professionals were present to provide support to the legions. The most relevant of these was the physician (medicus), at least some of whom appear to have been regarded as ranking with centurions (medicus ordinarius). A great proportion of these individuals appear to have hailed from the Hellenistic provinces, with some demonstrating a high degree of proficiency.

In addition to the medici, a variety of personnel were present, among them the optio valetudinari, who appears to have been responsible for the administration of the hospital. Individuals designated as "capsarii" – deriving their appellation from the term "casa," signifying a round first-aid/bandage container – administered a more rudimentary form of treatment in comparison to the senior medical personnel.

=== Rewards and decorations ===
The Roman Army knew several decorations for acts of bravery and military success. For officers there were various silver and golden crowns (coronae) for specific individual acts. The most important was the siege crown (Corona obsidionalis) for a victorious siege. Other were the wall crown (Corona muralis) for being the first scaling an enemy's wall. The corona vallaris was the counterpart of the corona muralis but awarded in the context of the storming of an enemy camp rather than of a town. For unspecific gallantry the golden crown (corona aurea) were awarded. The Naval crown (corona navalis) was awarded for being victorious at sea. The only crown that were awarded irrespective of rank, was the citizen crown (corona civica) for saving a roman citizen during a battle. Decorations for valour were available to all ranks including neck-bands or collars (torques) and medals (phalerae) worn on a harness, and bracelets/armbands (armillae) of precious metal, as well as grants of money and promotions.

=== Punishment and discipline ===
Discipline was enforced with severity. In the military, failure to perform one's duties, whether through cowardice in battle or other derelictions of duty, such as falling asleep on guard duty, was met with severe consequences. (Note: Some soldiers propped up their long shield with their pilum and then lean on it, dozing off whilst still standing up.) These consequences included fustuarium, a form of execution in which the offender was beaten to death by their comrades, a punishment meted out in cases where the offender had endangered the lives of others. Other forms of punishment included floggings and demotions. It is widely documented that the most renowned form of punishment was that of decimation, which was meted out to units that had retreating from battle in a dishonourable manner. A random selection of one tenth of the soldiers were designated for execution.

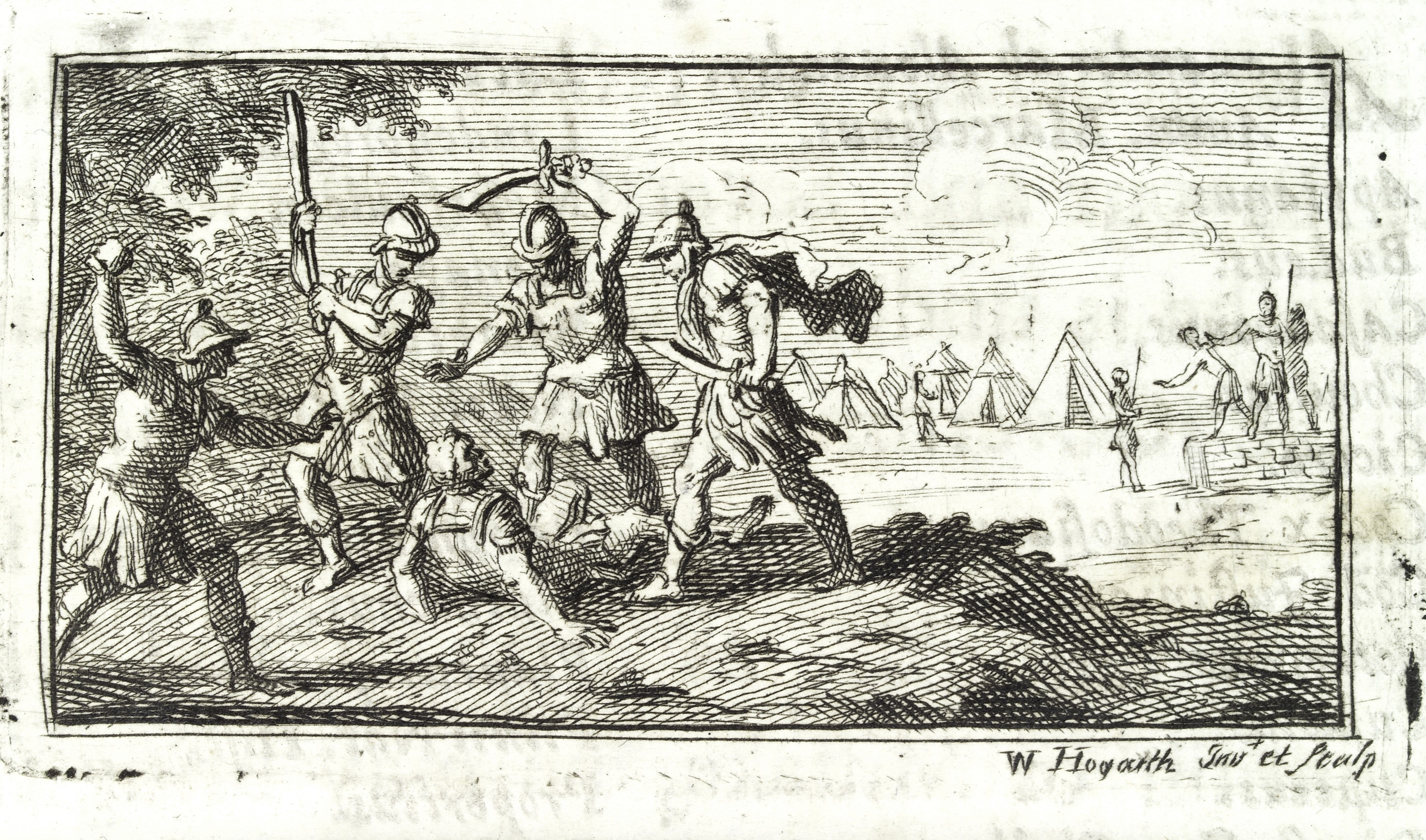
Roman soldier being punished by his peers

Further sanctions were of a symbolic nature, with the purpose of inflicting shame on those who had committed the offences. These included the provision of rations of barley, which was particularly disdained, or the requirement to erect tents and sleep outside the rampart of the camp. It is conceivable that the subjects might be divested of their military belts, that is to say, of their military identity, and compelled to parade outside the headquarters wearing heavy helmets and holding out long, heavy staffs or sods of turf. It is documented that Augustus did not merely discipline soldiers, but even centurions, by ordering them to stand at attention outside his tent for an entire day. They were permitted only their unbelted tunic and, it is hypothesised, a pole or clod of earth. The revocation of such penalties was contingent upon the redeployment of the soldiers in question.

== Tactics ==
The Roman Army employed a variety of sophisticated battlefield tactics designed to maximize their strengths and exploit enemy weaknesses. A key principle was the importance of maintaining adequate reserves to reinforce weak points or exploit opportunities during battle. Commanders typically positioned themselves on the right wing, with subordinate leaders stationed strategically along the battle line.

Two specific formations known as the wedge (cuneus) and the saw (serra) were central to Roman tactics. The wedge, primarily used by attacking legionaries, allowed small groups of soldiers to penetrate deep into enemy lines. Once inside, these formations could expand, forcing enemy troops into confined positions where hand-to-hand combat became difficult. This tactic took advantage of the Roman gladius, a short thrusting sword held low and used efficiently in close quarters, while rendering longer swords, such as those used by the Celts, unwieldy. To counter the wedge, opponents formed indentations in their line to prevent penetration. The saw, or serrated line of battle (serra proeliari), was another tactic. It involved experienced soldiers positioned behind the front rank, ready to advance where weaknesses appeared or to exploit moments when the enemy wavered.

Other tactics were:

- Standard Battle Formation: On flat terrain, the army was arranged with a strong center, two wings, and reserves positioned in the rear. The wings and reserves were reinforced to counter any attempts by the enemy to envelop or outflank their forces.
- Oblique Line with Right Wing Attack: The left wing was held back defensively, while the right wing advanced to turn the enemy's left flank. To counter this, the left wing could be reinforced with cavalry and reserves, while rough or impassable terrain was used to stabilize the defensive position. The right wing was positioned on open ground to ensure freedom of movement.
- Oblique Line with Left Wing Attack: Similar to the previous tactic, but with the left wing strengthened to execute the turning movement. This was employed when the enemy's right flank was identified as weak.
- Double-Wing Advance: Both wings advanced simultaneously, leaving the center behind. This could surprise the enemy by exposing and demoralizing their center. However, if the wings failed to break through, the army risked being divided into three vulnerable formations.
- Double-Wing Advance with Screened Center: A variation of the previous tactic, but with the center concealed by light infantry or archers. These troops distracted the enemy center while the wings engaged.
- Right Wing Envelopment: The right wing advanced for a turning movement, while the center and left wing were held back defensively. If successful, reserves could reinforce the left wing to complete an envelopment and compress the enemy center.
- Use of Natural Terrain: The flanks were protected by rough or impassable terrain, as outlined in the second tactic, to ensure that at least one wing would remain secure.

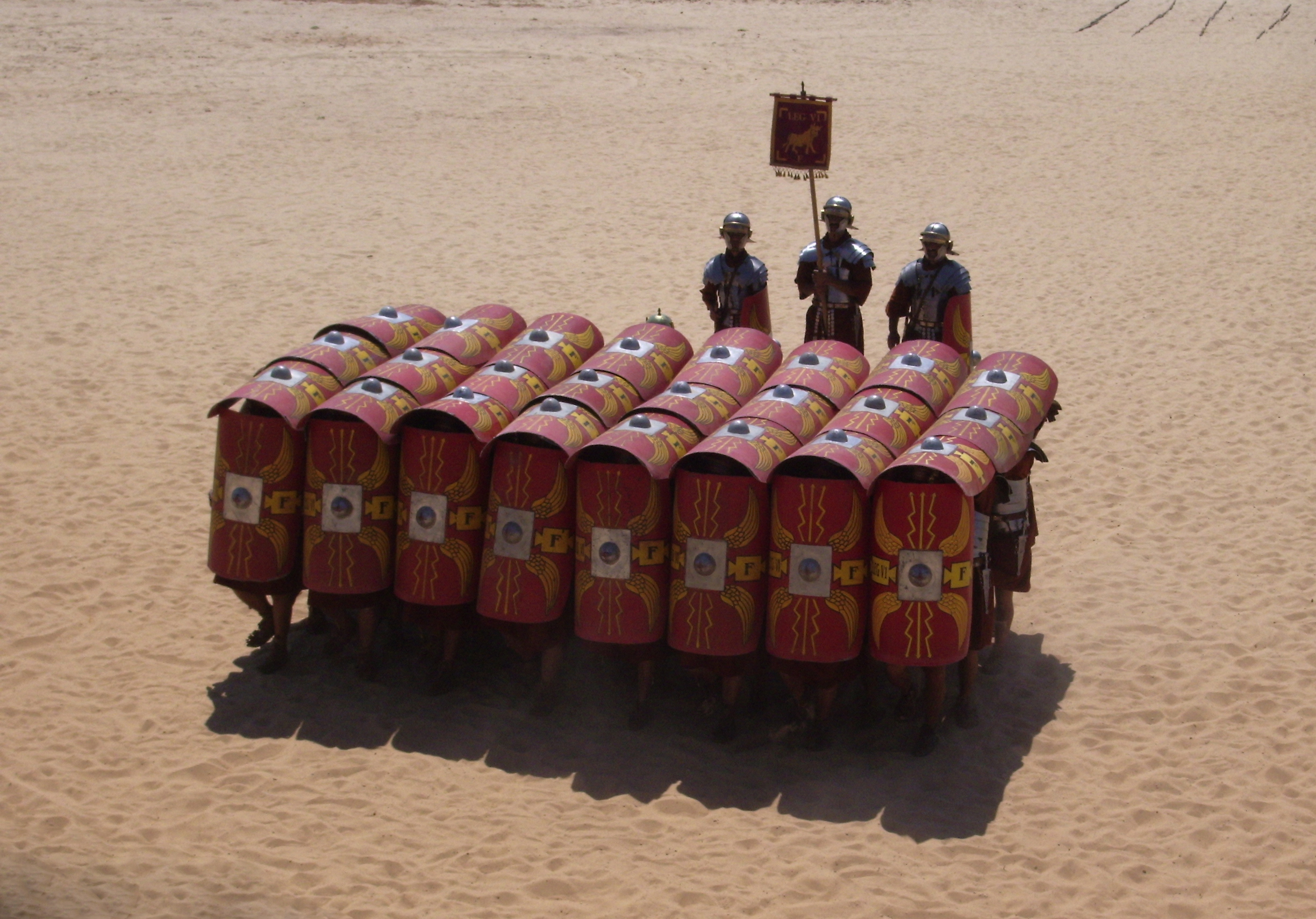
Testudo formation

The primary goal of Roman tactics, was to break the enemy's battle line. Turning a flank forced the enemy's center to fight on two fronts or in restricted space, creating a situation that was difficult to recover from. Even for the highly trained Roman army, altering tactics during a battle was challenging. The only units that could be effectively redeployed were reserves or those not yet engaged. As a result, the general's most critical decisions involved the initial arrangement of troops. If a weakness in the enemy line was identified, it was exploited by concentrating stronger forces against it. Similarly, the Romans employed deception to mislead the enemy about their battle line, disguising troop formations or the size of their forces. Soldiers could be packed tightly to appear fewer in number or spread out to seem larger. Surprise tactics were also common; small hidden units might suddenly emerge with dust and noise, creating the illusion of reinforcements.

Once the enemy line was broken, Roman tactics avoided surrounding the enemy completely. Leaving an escape route ensured that the enemy would flee rather than fight to the death. Retreating soldiers could then be pursued and attacked by Roman cavalry stationed on the flanks. In situations requiring withdrawal in the face of the enemy, Vegetius insisted of the importance of skill and deception. Roman troops were told that the retreat was a trap for the enemy, and cavalry was used to screen the movement. Units were withdrawn in an orderly fashion, but only if they had not yet been engaged. During a retreat, small detachments were left behind to ambush pursuing enemies, often turning the tide of the engagement.

Particular attention was paid to the dangers of marching. As every army was at its most vulnerable during a march, special precautions were required. Reconnaissance was essential, and a plan of the terrain through which the army would pass was recommended. Local guides, if employed, were to be guarded and closely monitored, as they could give misleading information out of ignorance. The route of the march was kept secret, and strong detachments were sent ahead to scout for potential traps or ambushes.

The marching order was carefully structured. The cavalry led the way, followed by the infantry, with the baggage train placed in the center and protected by the best units of the force. Since attacks were more likely to come from the rear, the baggage train was guarded by flank and rear guards. Servants accompanying the train were trained to maintain their positions and avoid panic during an attack to prevent disorder among the troops. The pace of the march was coordinated to keep the army cohesive and prevent it from splitting into vulnerable sections. Distances were calculated to account for terrain difficulties, allowing adequate time to reach the destination and ensuring sufficient water for men and horses, especially in summer.

== Equipment ==
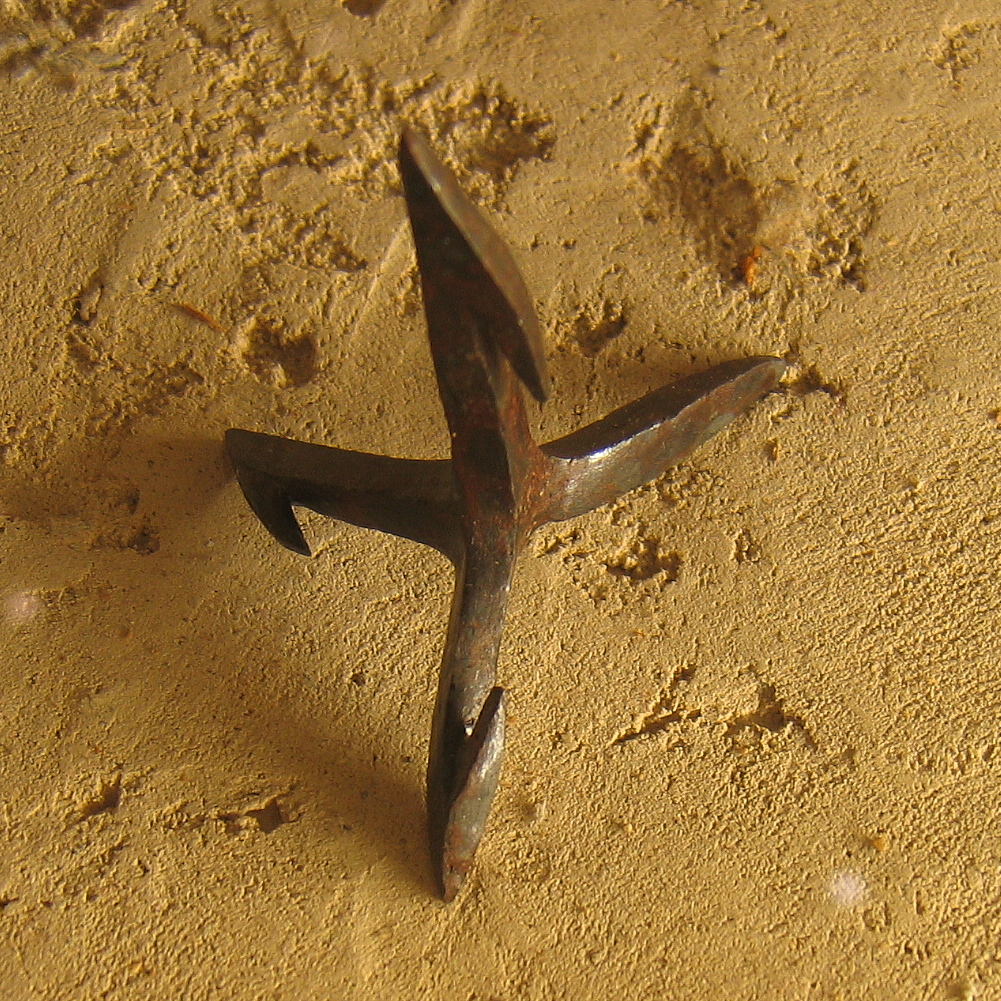
Roman caltrop

The Roman Imperial Army of the 1st and 2nd centuries CE employed a wide array of weapons and tools, meticulously crafted for efficiency, durability, and versatility in battle. These weapons were standardized across the army, ensuring uniform training, ease of production, and consistent performance on the battlefield. The arsenal included offensive and defensive weapons, ranging from personal arms to large-scale siege and naval equipment.

The gladius, the primary weapon of Roman infantry, was a short, double-edged sword with a pointed tip, measuring 18–24 inches (45–60 cm) in length. Designed for close combat, it excelled in stabbing and thrusting attacks, which were more lethal and required less space than slashing. Carried in a scabbard on the right side of the body, the gladius allowed soldiers to draw it quickly during battle. Complementing the gladius was the pilum, a heavy throwing spear about 2 meters (6.5 feet) long, with a unique iron shank that bent upon impact to prevent reuse by the enemy. Roman soldiers used the pilum to disrupt enemy formations before engaging in close combat. For mounted troops, the spatha, a longer sword measuring 75–100 cm (30–40 inches), was the weapon of choice. Its extended reach made it effective for slashing and thrusting from horseback, and it later influenced medieval European sword designs. They also used the lancea (light spear) approximately 1.8m 6 ft) long. It was suitable for throwing or thrusting over-arm while charging.

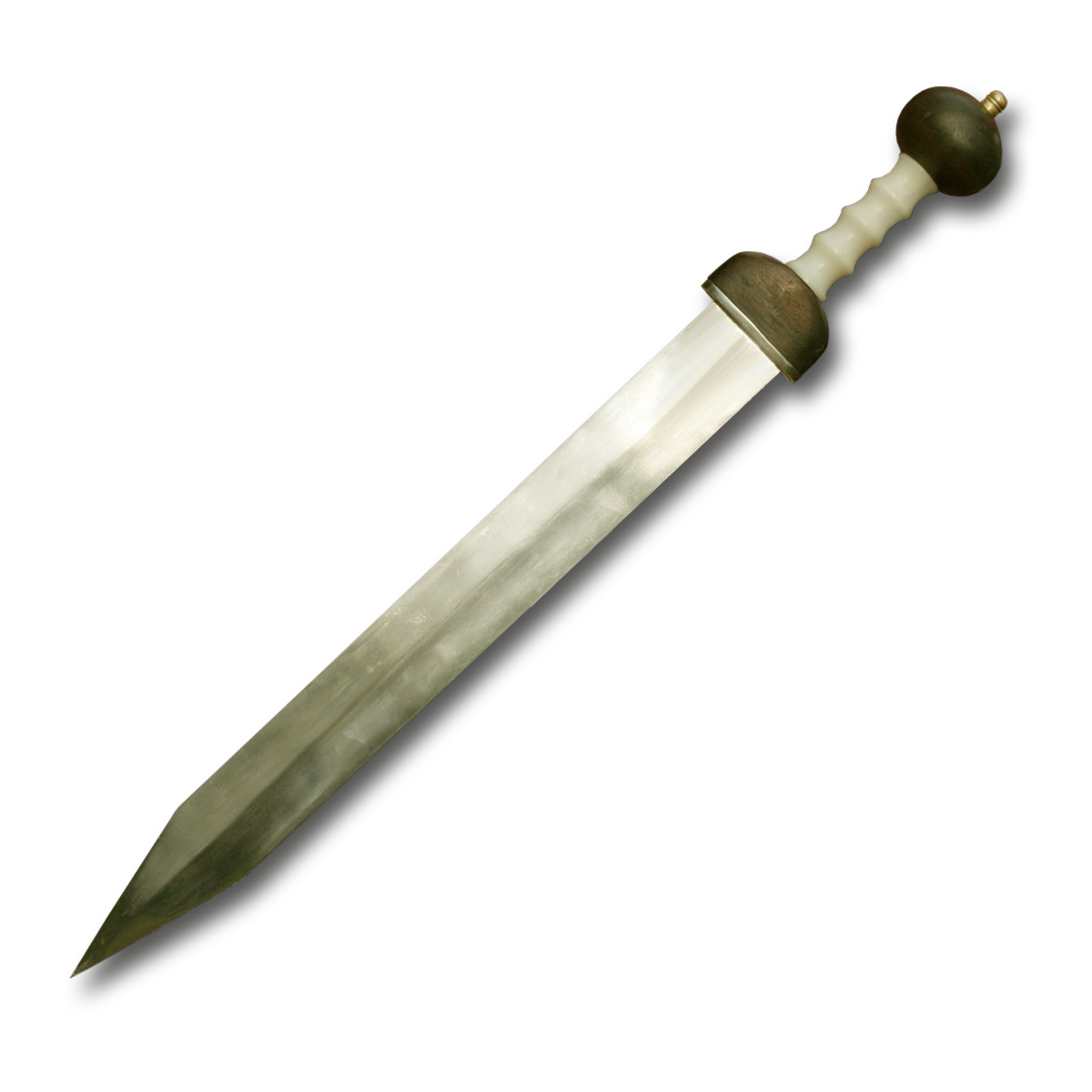
A roman gladius the common blade of the roman infantry

The pugio, a small dagger with a blade around 20–25 cm (8–10 inches) long, served as a secondary weapon. Primarily a utility tool, it could act as a weapon of last resort in close combat and was often decorated to signify rank or status.{ Roman archers, particularly auxiliaries, employed composite bows made of wood, horn, and sinew, capable of launching iron-tipped arrows with great force over long distances. These bows provided crucial ranged support in both sieges and open-field battles.

For siege and artillery, the scorpio, a small torsion-powered catapult, was used to fire bolts or small stones with precision at medium ranges. Compact and portable, it was particularly effective during sieges or in targeting enemy formations. Larger operations relied on the ballista, a torsion-powered siege weapon designed to launch stones or bolts over long distances. Crewed by multiple soldiers, the ballista was critical for breaching walls, destroying enemy defenses, or striking large groups of soldiers. A more portable version, the cheiroballistra, was operated by two soldiers and provided long-range support in sieges and field battles. The dolabra, a versatile tool resembling a pickaxe, was essential for engineering tasks such as digging and cutting but could also serve as a melee weapon when needed.

Defensive equipment included shields like the scutum, a large, rectangular shield used by legionaries. Measuring 1.2 meters (4 feet) tall and 0.6 meters (2 feet) wide, it was constructed from layers of wood covered with leather or canvas and reinforced with a metal boss (umbo). The curved design provided excellent protection and allowed soldiers to form tight formations like the testudo (tortoise formation). Auxiliary troops used the clipeus, a smaller, oval or round shield that was lighter and more maneuverable than the scutum, making it ideal for skirmishers or cavalry.

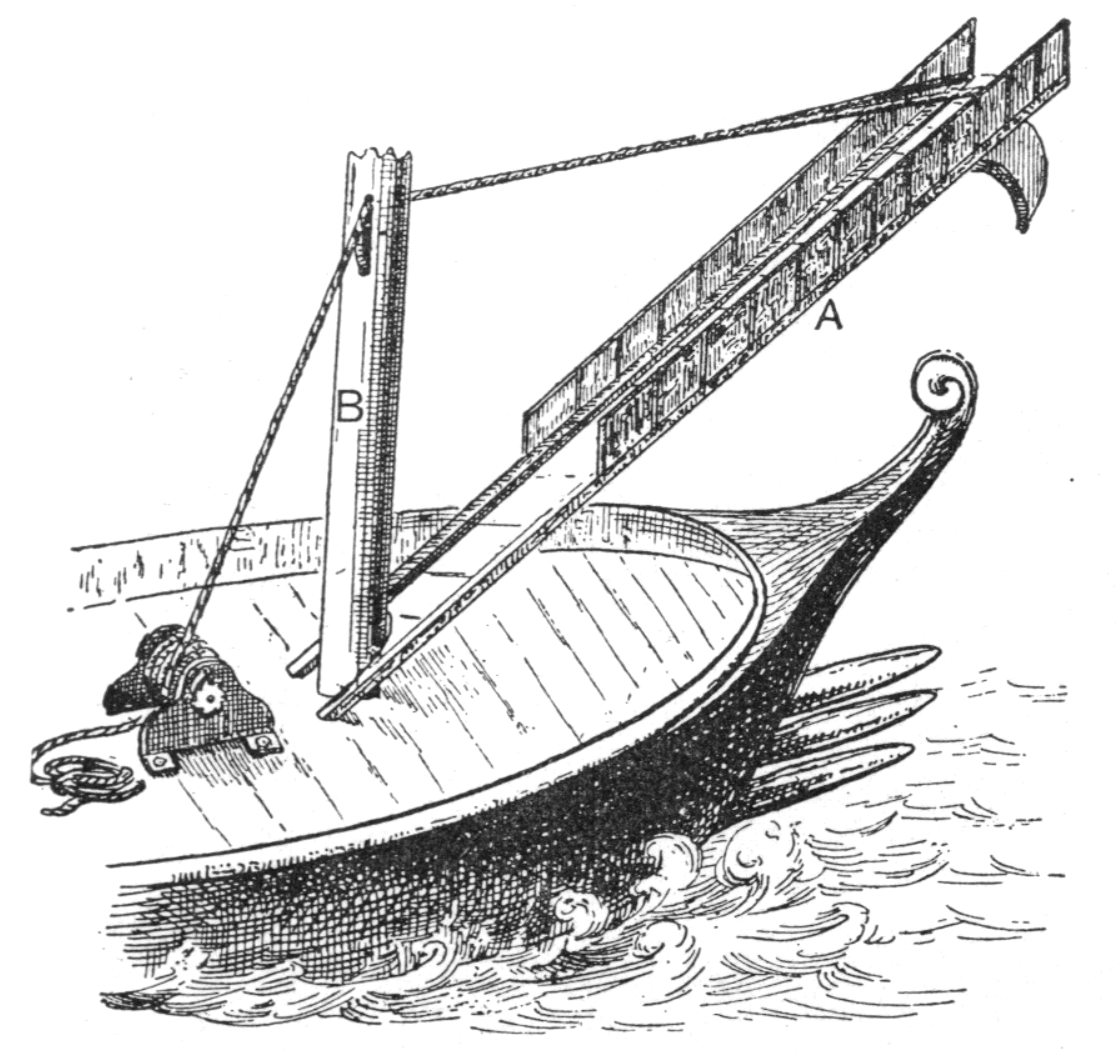
Roman corvus naval boarding device

Naval warfare featured several unique weapons and tools. The corvus, a boarding device, consisted of a wooden plank with a spike at the end that was dropped onto an enemy ship to secure it in place. This allowed Roman marines to board and engage in hand-to-hand combat, where their infantry skills excelled. Warships were also equipped with ballistae and catapults mounted on their decks to launch large stones, bolts, or incendiary materials at enemy vessels, causing damage and chaos before boarding. The rostrum, a bronze-covered ram mounted on the prow of Roman ships, was used to break enemy hulls or disable their ability to maneuver during engagements.

Defensive tactics also involved specialized tools like crow feet (Latin: tribuli), small spiked devices scattered on the ground to injure enemy soldiers or horses. Designed with upward-pointing spikes, they were highly effective in slowing down advancing troops or cavalry and were often used to protect camps or defensive positions. During sieges, the Romans utilized siege towers (turris), wheeled structures covered for protection and equipped with projectile weapons like catapults at the top to scale enemy walls.

== Bibliography ==
- Adkins, Lesley; Adkins, Roy (1996). Dictionary of Roman religion. New York: Facts on File. ISBN 0816030057.
- Cheesman, George Leonard (1975). The Auxilia of the Roman Imperial Army. Chicago: Ares. OCLC 569658623.
- Cowan, Ross (2014). Roman Guardsman 62 BC-AD 324. Oxford: Osprey. ISBN 9781782009252.
- Cowan, Ross (2003). Roman Legionary 58 BC-AD 69. Oxford: Osprey. ISBN 1-84176-600-3.
- D’ Amato, Raffaele (2009). Imperial Roman Naval Forces 31 BC– AD 500. Oxford: Osprey. ISBN 978-1-84603-317-9.
- D’ Amato, Raffaele (2018). Cataphractarii & Clibanarii 1st Century BC-Sth Century AD. Roman Heavy Cavalry. Vol. 1. Oxford: Osprey. ISBN 9781472830043.
- D’ Amato, Raffaele (2016). 31 BC–AD 195. Roman Army Units In The Western Provinces. Vol. 1. Oxford: Osprey. ISBN 978-1-4728-1537-8.
- Dando-Collins, Stephen (2002). Caesar's Legion. New York: John Wiley & Sons. ISBN 0-471-09570-2.
- Dando-Collins, Stephen (2010). Legions Of Rome The Definitive History Of Every Imperial Roman Legion. New York: Quercus. ISBN 978-1-62365201-2.
- Dixon, Karen (1997). The Roman cavalry : from the first to the third century AD. London: Routledge. ISBN 0415170397.
- Fields, Nils (2006). Roman Auxiliary Cavalryman: AD 14-193. Oxford: Osprey. ISBN 1841769738.
- Goldsworthy, Adrian (2010). En el nombre de Roma: Los hombres que forjaron el imperio. Barcelona: Ariel. ISBN 978-84-344-6929-7.
- Goldsworthy, Adrian (2007). The Complete Roman Army. London: Thames & Hudson. ISBN 978-0-500-05124-5.
- Grant, Michael (1974). The army of the Caesars. New York: Scribner. OCLC 1028215384.
- Hassall, Mark (2007). "The Army". The High Empire, a.D. 70-192. The Cambridge Ancient History. Vol. XI. Cambridge: Cambridge University Press. ISBN 978-0-521-26335-1.
- Johnson, Anne (1983). Roman forts of the 1st and 2nd centuries AD in Britain and the German provinces. New York: St. Martin's Press. ISBN 0312689810.
- Keppie, Lawrence (1984). The making of the Roman army : from Republic to Empire. London: Batsford. ISBN 0713436514.
- Keppie, Lawrence (2006). "The Army and the Navy". The Augustan Empire, 43 B.c.—A.D. 69. The Cambridge Ancient History. Vol. X. Cambridge: Cambridge University Press. ISBN 0521264308.
- Liebeschütz, J. H. W. G. (2007). "Religion". The High Empire, a.D. 70-192. The Cambridge Ancient History. Vol. XI. Cambridge: Cambridge University Press. ISBN 978-0-521-26335-1.
- Maxfield, Valerie A. (1981). The military decorations of the Roman army. London: Batsford. OCLC 1336110716.
- McNab, Chris (2010). The Roman army: The greatest war machine of the ancient world. Oxford: Osprey. ISBN 978-1-84908-162-7.
- Mousourakis, George (2007). A legal history of Rome. London: Routledge. ISBN 9780415408936.
- Nickerson, Hoffman; et al. (Warfare: a study of military methods from the earliest times) (1937). "The Imperial Roman Army: From Augustus to Hadrian 29 BC to 117 AD". Warfare in the Roman Empire, the dark and middle ages to 1494 AD. Washington D.C.: The infantry journal.
- Parker, Henry Michael (1928). The Roman legions. Oxford: Clarendon press. OCLC 1151159640.
- Starr, Chester G. (1975). The Roman imperial navy, 31 BC - AD 324. Westport: Greenwood Press. ISBN 0837179181.
- Stoll, Oliver; et al. (A Companion to the Roman Army) (2011). The Religions of the Armies. Chichester: Wiley-Blackwell. ISBN 978-1-4051-2153-8.
- Turcan, Robert (1996). The Cults of the Roman Empire. Oxford: Blackwell. ISBN 0631200460.
- Watson, George Ronald (1985). The Roman Soldier. Ithaca: Cornell University Press. ISBN 0801493129.
- Webster, Graham (1985). The Roman Imperial Army of the first and second centuries A.D. Totowa: Barnes & Noble. ISBN 0389205907.
