= List of Roman army unit types =

This is a list of Roman army units and bureaucrats.

- Accensus – Light infantry men in the armies of the early Roman Republic, made up of the poorest men of the army.
- Actuarius – A soldier charged with distributing pay and provisions.
- Adiutor – A camp or headquarters adjutant or assistant.
- Aeneator – Military musician such as a bugler
- Agrimensor – A surveyor (a type of immunes).
- Antesignano – Supposedly a light infantry unit of legionaries who were used for protection of marching columns and to provide security to legions.
- Aquilifer – Bearer of the legionary eagle.
- Ala – a military formation composed of conscripts from the Italian military allies.
- Alaris – A cavalryman serving in an ala.
- Auxilia – were introduced as non-citizen troops attached to the citizen legions by Augustus after his reorganisation of the Imperial Roman army from 30 BC.
- Architecti – An engineer or artillery constructor.
- Armicustos – A soldier tasked with the administration and supply of weapons and equipment. A quartermaster.
- Ballistarius – An artillery operator (a type of immunes).
- Beneficiarius – A soldier performing an extraordinary task such as military policing or a special assignment.
- Bucellarii – were formations of escort troops.
- Bucinator – A trumpeter or bugler.
- Cacula – Servant or slave of a soldier.
- Capsarior – A medical orderly.
- Causarius – A soldier discharged for wounds or other medical reasons.
- Celeres - A royal guard created by Romulus to guard the King of Rome.
- Centurion – Officer rank, generally one per 80 soldiers, in charge of a centuria.
- Clinicus – A medic.
- Cohors amicorum – Military staff company functioning as suite and bodyguard of a high Roman official.
- Cohortes urbanae
- Comes – commanders of comitatenses. The authority of a comes was limited to his assigned territory. This title later evolved to the medieval title of Count.
- Comes stabuli – An office responsible for the horses and pack animals.
- Comitatenses – units of the field armies of the late empire. They were the soldiers that replaced the legionaries.
- Cornicen – A bugler.
- Doctor – A trainer, subdivisions for everything from weapons to horn blowing.
- Draconarius – Bearer of a cavalry standard.
- Decurion – Leader of a troop of cavalry (14-30 men). Not to be confused with decanus.
- Decanus – Leader of a contubernium (a legionary tent group of 8 men). Elected by the members of the contubernium.
- Discens – Miles (enlisted soldier) in training for an immunis position.
- Duplarius – A soldier issued double pay, such as an Optio or a minor cavalry officer as part of a Turma
- Dux – A general in charge of two or more legions. In the Third Century AD, an officer with a regional command transcending provincial boundaries, responsible directly to the emperor alone, usually appointed on a temporary basis in a grave emergency. In the fourth century AD, an officer in charge of a section of the frontier answering to the Magister Militum. Later developed into the medieval title Duke.
- Duumviri navales – Two men elected to equip and repair the Roman navy.
- Equites singulares Augusti – Elite cavalry unit tasked to guard the Roman Emperors. Usually commanded by a tribunus of praetorian rank.
- Evocatus – "One who is called back." A soldier who had served out his time and obtained his discharge (missio), but had voluntarily enlisted again at the invitation of the consul or other commander.
- Evocatus Augusti – Praetorian Guard who had served out his time and obtained his discharge (missio), but had voluntarily enlisted again.
- Equites – Roman cavalry. Those citizens whose personal wealth was sufficient to own and equip a horse for cavalry, later evolved into a socioeconomic distinction unrelated to military service.
- Exploratores - The scouts and reconnaissance element of the Roman army.
- Foederati – For groups of "barbarian" mercenaries of various sizes who were typically allowed to settle within the empire after service in the imperial army. Foederati, unlike auxilia which were commanded by Roman officers, and enlisted under the promise of obtaining Roman citizenship after completing their term of service of 20 to 25 years, were enlisted as an entire tribal unit, serving under native commanders, and not eligible to receive citizenship. Originally paid in money, but as the finances of the Late Empire declined, service in exchange for land became the norm. The sack of Rome in the 5th century by Vandals and Ostrogoths were precipitated by the Senate's failure to pay foederati as promised after their military service. The system of land tenure established by the settlement of foederati, whose leaders were granted territories as their personal property, developed into the medieval system of feudalism.
- Frumentarii – Officials of the Roman Empire during the 2nd and 3rd era. Often used as a Secret Service, mostly operating in uniform.
- Hastatus – The youngest of the heavy infantry in the pre-Marian armies, who were less well-equipped than the older Principes and Triarii. These formed the first line of battle in front of the Principes.
- Hastatus Prior – A centurion commanding a manipulus or centuria of hastati. A high-ranking officer within a manipulus or centuria.
- Hastatus Posterior – A deputy to the hastatus prior
- Hastiliarius – A weapons instructor.
- Imaginifer – A standard-bearer carrying the imago – the standard which bore a likeness of the emperor, and, at later dates, his family.
- Immunes – Soldiers who were "immune" from combat duty and fatigues through having a more specialist role within the army.
- Jovians and Herculians – A senior palatine units
- Katepano – A Byzantine military rank or military official.
- Laeti – was a term used in the late empire to denote communities of foreigners permitted to settle on, and granted land in, imperial territory on condition that they provide recruits for the Roman military.
- Legatus legionis – A legion commander of senatorial rank; literally the "deputy" of the emperor, who was the titular commander-in-chief.
- Limitanei – A unit of frontier districts.
- Legatus pro praetore – Provincial governor of senatorial rank with multiple legions under his command.
- Legionary – The heavy infantry that was the basic military force of the ancient Roman army in the period of the late Roman Republic and the early Roman Empire.
- Magister militum - High ranked commander in the late Roman Empire. Equivalent of a general.
- Medicus – Physician or combat medic. Specializations included surgery (medicus vulnerarius), ophthalmology (medicus ocularius), and also veterinary (medicus veterinarius). At least some held rank equivalent to a centurion.
- Megas doux – Commander-in-chief of the Byzantine navy.
- Miles or Miles Gregarius – The basic private level foot soldier.
- Numerus – A unit of foreign allies not integrated into the regular army structure. Later, a unit of border forces.
- Numerus Batavorum – was a personal, imperial guards unit for the Roman emperors of the Julio-Claudian dynasty (30 BC – AD 68) composed of Germanic soldiers.
- Optio – One per century as second-in-command to the centurion. Could also fill several other specialized roles on an ad hoc basis.
- Palatini – were elite units of the late army.
- Pedites – The infantry of the early army of the Roman kingdom. The majority of the army in this period.
- Peditatus – A term referring to any infantryman in the Roman Empire.
- Pilus Prior – Senior centurion of a cohort.
- Pilus Posterior – Deputy to the pilus prior.
- Praefectus Castrorum – Camp prefect, third-in-command of the legion, also responsible for maintaining the camp, equipment, and supplies. Usually a former primus pilus.
- Praefectus Cohortis - Commander of a cohort.
- Praefectus legionis agens vice legati – Equestrian officer given the command of a legion in the absence of a senatorial legatus. After the removal of senators from military command, the title of a legionary commander. ("...agens vice legati, dropped in later Third Century")
- Praetorians – A special force of bodyguards used by Roman Emperors.
- Praetorian prefect – Commander of the Praetorians.
- Primani – was a legio palatina, active in the 4th and 5th century.
- Primicerius – was a rank junior to the tribunus and senior to the senator.
- Primus Ordinis – The commanding officer of each centuria in the first cohort with the exception of the first centuria of the cohort.
- Primus Pilus (literally 'first file') – The centurion commanding the first cohort and the senior centurion of the entire Legion.
- Princeps – Pre-Marian soldier, initially equipped with the Hasta spear, but later with the pilum, these men formed the second line of battle behind the Hastati in the pre-Marian armies. They were also chieftains in Briton like Dumnorix of the Regneses (he was killed by Gaius Salvius Liberalis' soldiers).
- Princeps Prior – A centurion commanding a century of principes.
- Princeps Posterior – A deputy to the princeps prior.
- Principales – A group of ranks, including aquilifer, signifer, optio, and tesserarius. Similar to modern NCOs (Non-commissioned officers).
- Protectores Augusti Nostri (a.k.a. Protectores Divini Lateris) – Honorific title for senior officers singled out for their loyalty to the Emperor and soldierly qualities. The protectores were an order of honor rather than a military unit. The order first appeared in the mid-200s AD.
- Quaestionarius – An interrogator or torturer.
- Retentus – A soldier kept in service after serving required term.
- Rorarii – The final line, or reserve, in the ancient pre-Marius Roman army. These were removed even before the so-called "Marian reforms", as the Triarii provided a very sturdy anchor.
- Sagittarii – Archers, including horse-riding auxiliary archers recruited mainly in North Africa, Balkans, and later the Eastern Empire.
- Salararius – A soldier enjoying special service conditions or hired as a mercenary.
- Scholae – was used in the late Roman Empire to signify a unit of Imperial Guards.
- Scholae Palatinae – An elite troop of soldiers created by the Emperor Constantine the Great to provide personal protection of the Emperor and his immediate family.
- Scorpionarius – An artilleryman operating a scorpio artillery piece.
- Sesquiplicarii – A soldier issued one-and-a-half times pay, such as a Tesserarius or a minor cavalry officer as part of a Turma
- Signifer – Standard bearer of the Roman Legion.
- Simplares - A soldier paid standard pay; a regular legionaire or somebody paid the equivalent
- Socii – Troops from allied states in the pre-Marian army before the Social War (91–88 BC)
- Speculatores – The scouts and reconnaissance element of the Roman army.
- Supernumerarii – Supernumerary soldiers who served to fill the places of those who were killed or disabled by their wounds. Also used for the cavalry contingent of a legion during the Principate, who despite being included on the cohort lists, camped separate to the infantry.
- Strategos - General and military governor of a theme in the Byzantine Empire.
- Stratelates – A Greek translation for the rank of magister militum that was used in the late Roman and Byzantine armies.
- Stratopedarches – A term originally used to refer to a Roman camp prefect, it was later used for a Roman or Byzantine general or a Byzantine commander-in-chief.
- Tablifer – A standard-bearer for the guard cavalry.
- Tesserarius – Guard commander, one per centuria.
- Tirones – A basic trainee.
- Torquati - A soldier issued with a golden collar in reward for bravery or valor. Depending on circumstances, they may also be rewarded with double pay, making them Torquato Duplares
- Triarii – Spearmen of the pre-Marian armies, equipped with the Hasta, who formed the third line of battle behind the Principes.
- Tribuni angusticlavii – Military tribune of equestrian rank, five of whom were assigned to each legion.
- Tribunus militum - Officer in the Roman army who ranked below the legate but above the centurion.
- Tribunus militum laticlavius – Military tribune of senatorial rank. Second in command of a legion. Appointments to this rank seem to have ceased during the sole reign of Gallienus as part of a policy of excluding senators from military commands.
- Tubicen – A trumpeter.
- Urbanae – A special police force of Rome, created to counterbalance the Praetorians.
- Velites – A class of light infantry in the army of the Roman Republic.
- Venator – A hunter (a type of immunes).
- Vexillarius – Bearer of a vexillum (standard).
- Vigiles – were the firefighters and police.

== Sub-units of the Roman legion ==
Before the so-called "Marian reforms", the structure of the legions was as follows:

- Contubernium – The smallest organized unit of soldiers in the Roman Army. It was composed of eight legionaries led by a decanus. When on the march a Legion would often march contubernium-abreast (8-abreast). In the Imperial Legion, ten contubernia formed a centuria.
- Maniple (Manipulus) – The pre-Marian sub-unit of the Roman Legions, consisting of 120 men (60 for the Triarii).
- Legio (Republic) – A legion in the pre-Marian armies consisted of 60 manipuli of infantry and 10 turmae of cavalry. By 250 BC, there would be four Legions, two commanded by each Consul: two Roman legions which would be accompanied by an additional two allied Legions of similar strength and structure. For every Roman Legion there would be an allied Legion.
- Turma – A unit of cavalry in the pre-Marian army, which usually consisted of 32 horsemen.

After the consulships of Gaius Marius, the organisation of the legions would standardise as follows:

- Contubernium – The smallest organized unit of soldiers in the Roman Army. It was composed of eight legionaries led by a decanus. Ten contubernia formed a centuria.
- Centuria – 80 legionaries under the command of a centurion and his optio. Six centuriae formed a cohors.
- Cohors (cohort) – A cohors consisted of 480 legionaries. The most senior ranking centurion of the six centuriae commanded the entire cohors.
- First Cohort (Cohors Prima) – The first cohort was a double strength cohort (consisting of five double-strength centuriae), numbering 800 legionaries (excluding officers). The centurion of its first centuria, the Primus Pilus, commanded the first cohort and was also the most senior centurion in the legion.
- Legio (Imperial) – A legion was composed of nine cohorts and one first cohort. The legion's overall commander was the legatus legionis, assisted by the praefectus castrorum and other senior officers.
- Vexillatio – A temporary task force of one or more centuriae detached from the legion for a specific purpose. A vexillatio was commanded by an officer appointed by the Legatus.
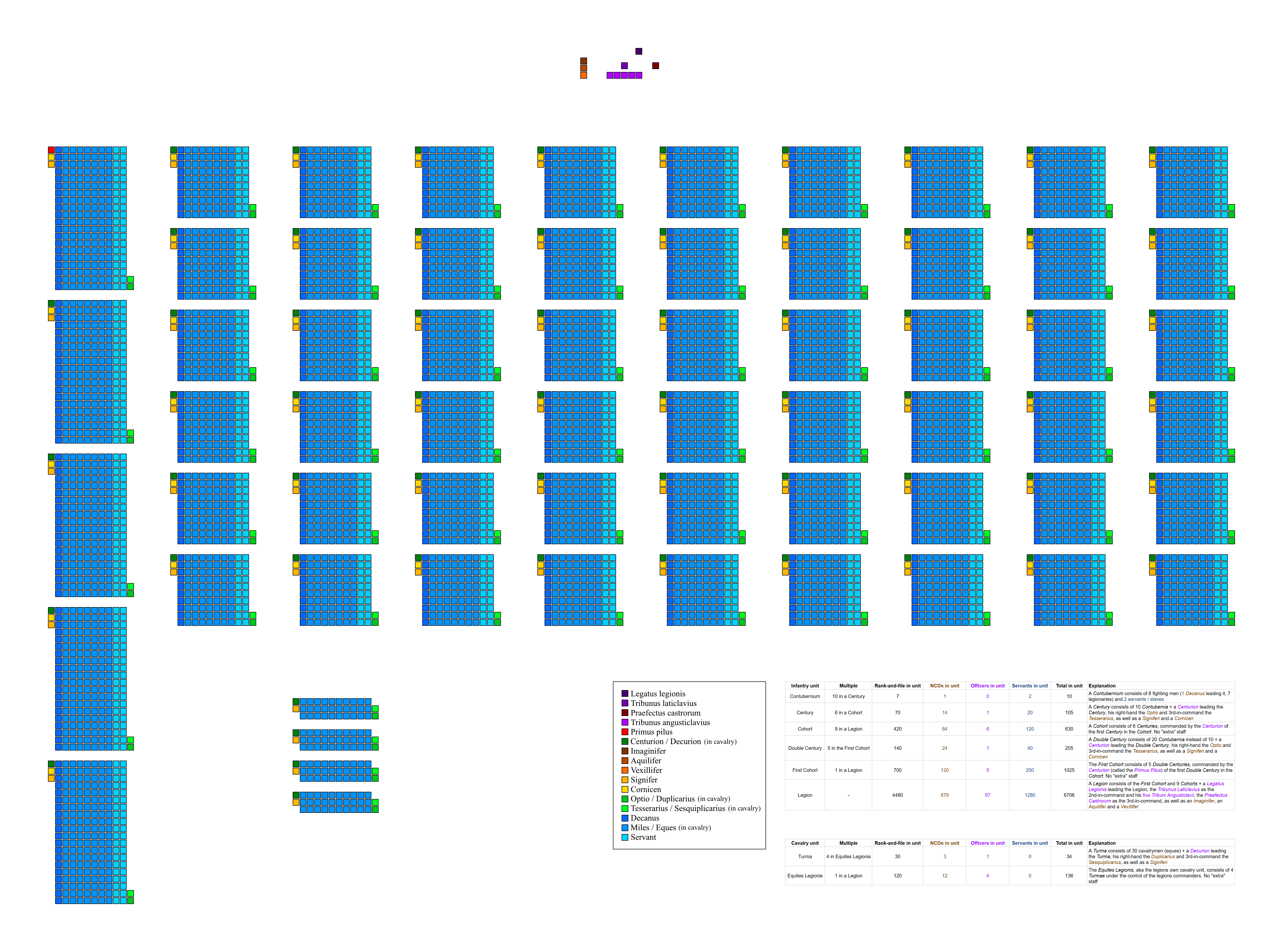
Structure of the Imperial Roman Legion (each Square representing a combatant or a servant)

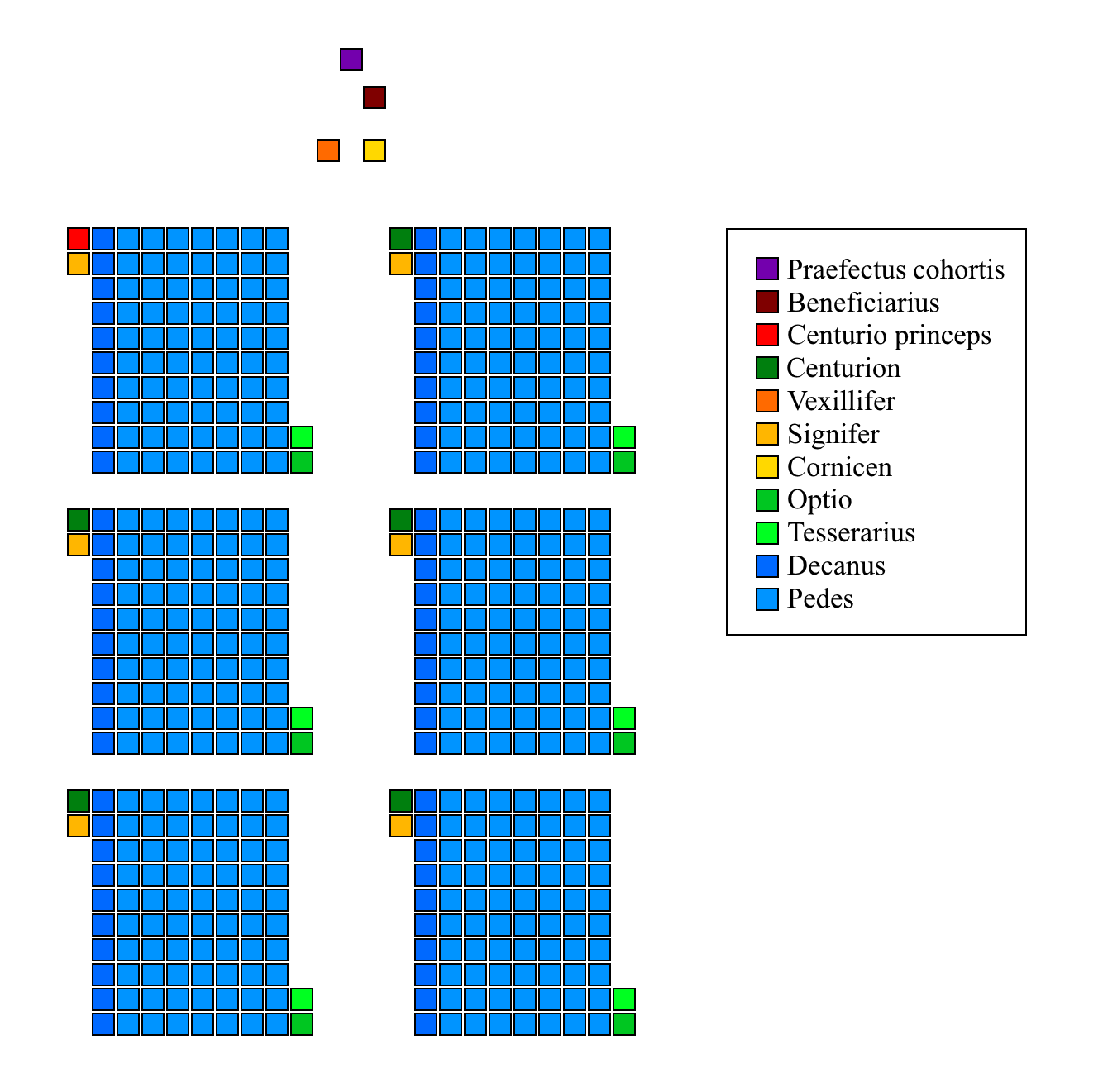
Structure of the Imperial Roman Auxiliary cohort

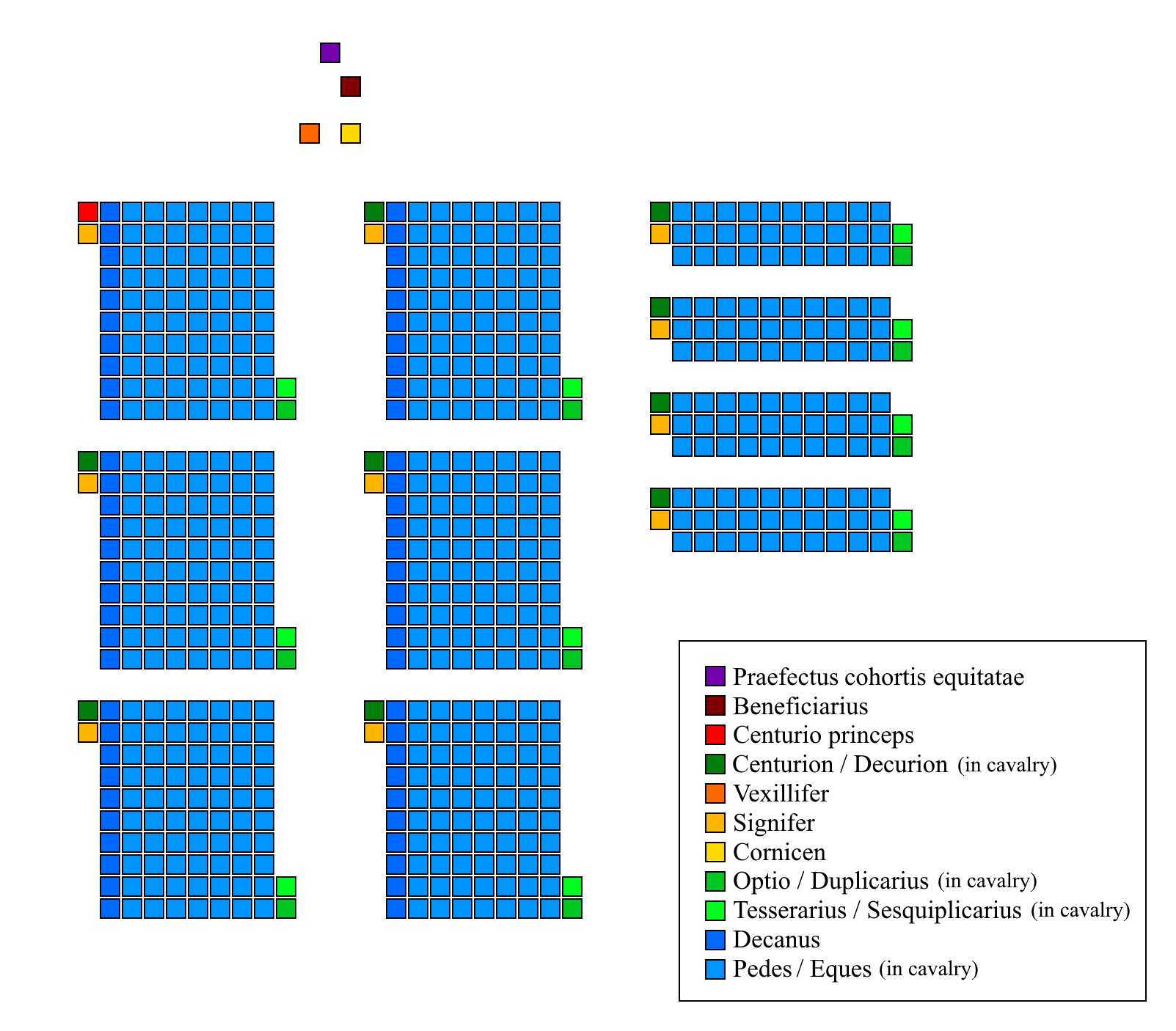
Structure of the Imperial Roman Auxiliary cohors equitata

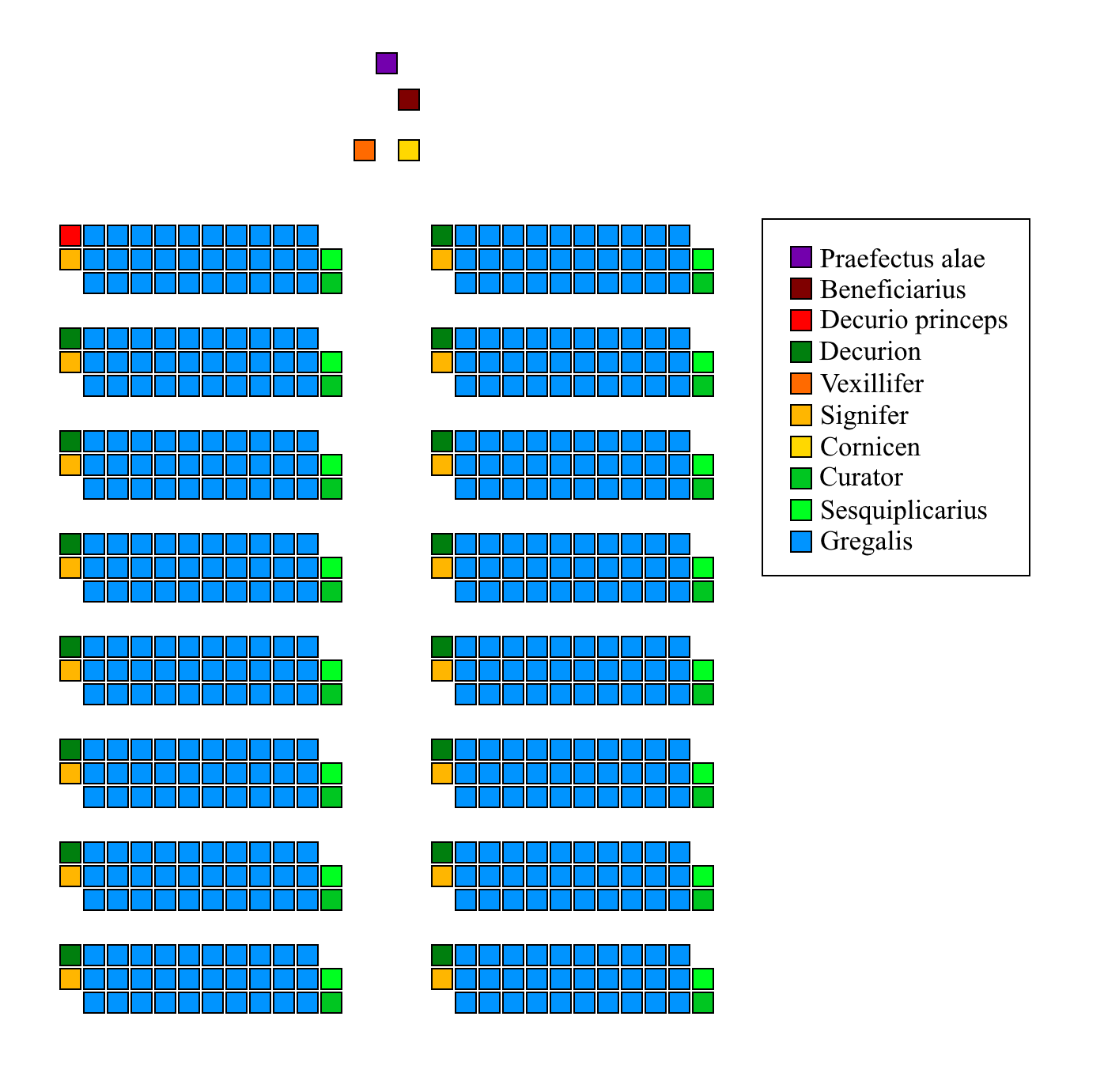
Structure of the Imperial Roman Auxiliary ala

== Bibliography ==
- Cowan, Ross (2003). Roman Legionary 58 BC-AD 69. Oxford: Osprey. ISBN 1-84176-600-3.
- Goldsworthy, Adrian (2007). The Complete Roman Army. London: Thames & Hudson. ISBN 978-0-500-05124-5.
- Keppie, Lawrence (1984). The making of the Roman army : from Republic to Empire. London: Batsford. ISBN 0713436514.
- Watson, George Ronald (1985). The Roman Soldier. Ithaca: Cornell University Press. ISBN 0801493129.
- Webster, Graham (1985). The Roman Imperial Army of the first and second centuries A.D. Totowa: Barnes & Noble. ISBN 0389205907.
