= Sesquiplarius =

Sesquiplicarius, plural sesquiplicares, was an inferior, low-ranking Roman officer, who received a ration and a half or increased payment valuing the additional ration based on their valor. As part of cavalry, one decurio, one duplicarius, and one sesquiplicarius was assigned to one turma. Golden badged sesquiplicares were named Torquati sesquiplicares.

== See also ==
- List of Roman army unit types
