= Ballistarius =

Roman army infantrymen

Ballistarius (plural ballistarii) were infantrymen, serving as artillerymen of the Roman army who handled ballistae. They were classed as immunes, exempt from fatigue duty of entrenching or building.

== See also ==
- List of Roman army unit types
