= Tesserarius =

Watch commander in the Roman army

A tesserarius (Latin: tesserārius, from tessera, a small tile or block of wood on which watchwords were written) was a watch commander in the Roman army. They organized and had command over the nightly guard assigned to keep watch over the fort when in garrison or on campaign and were responsible for getting the watchwords from the commander and seeing that they were kept safe. There was one tesserarius to each centuria (Wilkes, 1972). They held a position similar to that of a first sergeant of a company in modern armies and acted as seconds to the optiones.

Tesserary pay was one and a half times (sesquiplicarii) that of the standard legionary pay.

== See also ==
- List of Roman army unit types
