= Tirones =

Fresh recruits of Roman Army

Tirones (Latin: tiro, tironis) were new recruits in the armies of the Roman Empire. A tiro could take up to six months before becoming a full miles (infantryman/private).

In the 4th century, Vegetius describes his ideal, rigorous training, in contrast to the lax habits of his own day:

Of aspirants for enlistment were required good eyes and sound and vigorous bodies; but no definite height, certain units excepted, seems to have been prescribed... After taking the oath (sacramentum), the recruits entered upon an intensive and apparently endless course of training. The success of Roman arms, like all others, came from drill, discipline and training.

== Enlistment ==
"If we follow the ancient practice, the proper time for enlisting youth into the army is at their entrance into the age of puberty... A sufficient time is also required for his instruction in the different branches of the service. It is no easy matter to train the horse or foot archer, or to form the legionary soldier to every part of the drill, to teach him not to quit his post, to keep ranks, to take a proper aim and throw his missile weapons with force, to dig trenches, to plant palisades, how to manage his shield, glance off the blows of the enemy, and how to parry a stroke with dexterity.

We find the ancients very fond of procuring the tallest men they could for the service, since the standard for the cavalry of the wings and for the infantry of the first legionary cohorts was fixed at six feet, or at least five feet ten inches. These requirements might easily be kept up in those times when such numbers followed the profession of arms and before it was the fashion for the flower of Roman youth to devote themselves to the civil offices of state. But when necessity requires it, the height of a man is not to be regarded so much as his strength...

The young soldier, therefore, ought to have a lively eye, should carry his head erect, his chest should be broad, his shoulders muscular and brawny, his fingers long, his arms strong, his waist small, his shape easy, his legs and feet rather nervous than fleshy....

On the careful choice of soldiers depends the welfare of the Republic, and the very essence of the Roman Empire and its power is so inseparably connected with this charge, that it is of the highest importance not to be entrusted indiscriminately, but only to persons whose fidelity can be relied on."

== Training ==
"The first thing the soldiers are to be taught is the military step, which can only be acquired by constant practice of marching quick and together..." Tirones were also exercised in running, jumping and swimming, carrying heavy packs and entrenching camps.

"We are informed by the writings of the ancients that, among their other exercises, they had that of the post. They gave their recruits round bucklers woven with willows, twice as heavy as those used on real service, and wooden swords double the weight of the common ones. They exercised them with these at the post both morning and afternoon."

Other weapons training at this time also included the javelin, bow, throwing stone, sling and 'martiobarbuli' — usually reconstructed as weighted darts or small javelins. Tirones were also taught to vault into the saddle.
