= Decanus =

Ancient Roman and ecclesiastical rank

Decanus means "chief of ten" in Late Latin. The term originated in the Roman army and became used thereafter for subaltern officials in the Byzantine Empire, as well as for various positions in the Church, whence derives the English title "dean". It is unrelated to the position of deacon (Latin diaconus, Greek διάκονος).

== History and functions ==
The decanus was originally the leader of a 10-man contubernium, which consisted of the squad of eight legionaries who lived in the same tent, plus the two support units/servants of the contubernium. The title must not be confused with the decurio, which was a title given to civic officials and to leaders of 30-strong squadrons (turmae) of cavalry. Decanus is equivalent to the rank of the dekarchos ("commander of ten") in Greek texts.

From the 4th century AD the term decanus became used for palace messengers, particularly those in the service of Roman empresses. Decani also apparently served as guards at gates, and in the 6th century, John Lydus equates them with the ancient lictors. In the 899 Klētorologion of Philotheos, the decanus (transcribed into Greek as δεκανός, dekanos) was a mid-level functionary, serving under the protasekretis. According to the mid-10th century De Ceremoniis of Emperor Constantine VII Porphyrogennetos (r. 913–959), a decanus was "in charge of the imperial papers" when the Byzantine emperor was on campaign. Sigillographic evidence for the Byzantine dekanoi is relatively rare, although some are depicted in illuminated manuscripts, where their appearance varies considerably, in accord with their varying and changing functions.

In the Christian Church, the term came into use in monasteries for heads of groups of ten other monks, for low-ranking subaltern officials of the Patriarchate of Constantinople, and for the ecclesiastic fossores ("grave-diggers").

== See also ==
- Centurion, commander of 100
- Chiliarch, commander of 1,000

== Sources ==
- Bury, J. B.; Philotheus (1911). The Imperial Administrative System of the Ninth Century (With a Revised Text of the Kletorologion of Philotheos). London: Oxford University Press.
- Kazhdan, Alexander; Cutler, Anthony (1991). "Dekanos". In Kazhdan, Alexander (ed.). The Oxford Dictionary of Byzantium. Oxford and New York: Oxford University Press. p. 601. ISBN 0-19-504652-8.
