= Optio =

Officer rank within the Roman army

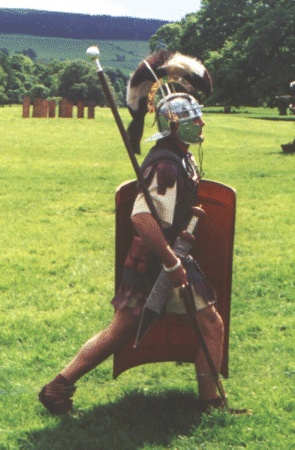
Roman optio in a re-enactment at Chesters Fort in May 2000

In a Roman army an optio (Latin: optiō, from optāre, 'to choose', so-called because superior officers chose the optio; pl.: optiones) held a rank in a centuria (century) similar to that of an executive officer. The main function of an optio was as an optio centuriae, the second-in-command of a century, although there were many other roles an optio could fulfill.

Optiones carried out vital roles in the Roman military. An optio was stationed at the rear of the ranks to keep the troops in order. His duties would include enforcing the orders of the centurion, taking over the centurion's command in battle should the need arise, supervising his subordinates, and a variety of administrative duties.

Optio pay was double the standard legionary pay and optiones were the most likely candidates to replace the centurion if his position became vacant.

== Types of optio ==
Titles held by optiones included:

- Optio ad carcerem: chosen man on prison duty (incarceration).
- Optio ad spem ordinis: optio being groomed for promotion to the rank of centurion.
- Optio candidatus: optio being groomed or marked out for promotion to the rank of centurion.
- Optio carceris: soldier in charge of the prison cells.
- Optio centuriae: 'chosen man of the centuria'; second-in-command and rear rank officer of a centuria; classed as a duplicarius, a soldier receiving double basic pay; he carried a hastile (wooden staff).
- Optio centurionis: 'chosen man of the centurion'; same as optio centuriae.
- Optio custodiarum: soldier in charge of guard posts.
- Optio draconarius: 'chosen man among the dragon bearers', a late Roman senior standard bearer.
- Optio equitum: optio in the legionary or Praetorian cavalry (equus meaning horse).
- Optio fabricae: soldier in charge of a workshop.
- Optio navaliorum: soldier in charge of boats.
- Optio praetorii: soldier attached to headquarters.
- Optio principalis: optio who held supervisory rank (principales from the 2nd century onwards); not all who had the title of optio held this status.
- Optio speculatorum: optio in the elite cavalry bodyguards.
- Optio spei: optio being groomed for promotion to the rank of centurion.
- Optio statorum: optio of military police.
- Optio tribuni: assistant to a tribune.
- Optio valetudinarii: orderly in charge of a hospital.

== Uniform ==
Unlike the centurion, the cuirass was not the distinguishing part of the optio's uniform.

An optio's armour would be more like those of the common legionary. He could wear the lorica segmentata or a lorica hamata as well as have his gladius on the right, not the left, side. One thing that did separate him from the common legionary was the staff (called a hastile), which was used to keep the legionaries in line. This staff would be roughly as tall as the optio himself. Optiones often carried wax tablets on which they kept the orders of the day.

== Vegetius on optiones ==
The optiones are subaltern officers, so denominated from their being selected by the option of their superior officers, to do their duty as their substitutes or lieutenants in case of sickness or other accident.

— Flavius Vegetius Renatus, "Book II: The Organization of the Legion". De re militari [Concerning Military Matters]. London, UK. 1767 – via Digital Attic. Translated from the Latin by Lieutenant John Clarke.

== See also ==
- Imperial helmet – helmet "Type I" may have belonged to an optio.
- List of Roman army unit types
