= Cohortes urbanae =

Urban military police in ancient Rome

The cohortes urbanae (Latin meaning urban cohorts) of ancient Rome were created by Augustus to counterbalance the enormous power of the Praetorian Guard in the city of Rome and serve as a police service. They were led by the urban prefect.

== Duties ==
The gangs of Titus Annius Milo, Publius Clodius and others which were used by rival politicians during the Republic had been eliminated mostly due to the efforts of Pompeius Magnus. Although political gangs were a thing of the past since effective power no longer resided in the competing factions of the Roman Senate and elected officials, some kind of police force was necessary to maintain public order and prevent civil disturbances, akin to a modern gendarmerie. To fulfill this purpose Augustus established three urban cohorts (cohortes urbanae) under a newly appointed prefect of the city. Their primary role was to police Rome and counteract roaming mobs and gangs that often haunted its streets during the Republic. The urban cohorts thus acted as a heavy duty police force, capable of riot control duties, while their contemporaries, the Vigiles, policed the streets and fought fires. As a trained paramilitary organization, the urban cohorts could, on rare occasions, go to battle if necessary. This role, however, was only called upon in dire situations.

Unlike the Vigiles, who mostly operated at night as firefighters and watchmen, members of the urban cohorts were considered legionaries, though with higher pay than the regular legions—if not quite as much as the Praetorian Guards—and tended to receive slightly higher donatives, though not as much as the Praetorians.

== Organization ==
Originally the cohortes urbanae were divided into three cohorts, each cohort being commanded by one tribune and six centurions. In the time of the Flavians this was increased to four cohorts. Each cohort contained around five hundred men. Only free citizens were eligible to serve in their ranks. As with the Praetorians, the men of the urban cohorts were predominantly of Italian stock. Urban cohorts, (known as city cohorts in non-Roman cities) were later created in both the Roman North African city of Carthage and the city of Lugdunum in Roman Gaul (modern Lyon).

== See also ==
- List of Roman army unit types
