= Duplarius =

Roman officer rank

Duplarius (pl.: duplares), duplicarius or dupliciarius was an inferior, low-ranking Roman officer, who received double rations or increased payment valuing the 2nd ration based on their valor. As part of cavalry, one decurio, one duplicarius, and one sesquiplarius was assigned to one turma. Each duplarius as part of a turma was allowed to have two horses. Golden-badged duplares were named Torquati duplares.

== See also ==
- List of Roman army unit types
