= Contubernium (Roman army unit) =

Smallest unit of soldiers in the Roman Army

The contubernium (Latin for 'tenting-together') was the smallest organised sub-subunit of soldiers in the Roman Army and was composed of eight legionaries, essentially the equivalent of a modern squad, although unlike modern squads, contubernia seemingly had no tactical significance in Roman military organization or battle. It was likely used to maintain morale and group solidarity by keeping soldiers in close contact with each other. The men within the contubernium were known as contubernales. Ten contubernia, each led by a decanus experienced soldier who assumed leadership when there were no orders from above, were grouped into a centuria of 100 men (eighty legionaries plus twenty support staff), which was commanded by a centurion. Soldiers of a contubernium shared a tent, equipment and a mule for transporting supplies, and could be rewarded or punished together as a unit (see decimation).

== Organization ==
The contubernium was, at least very late in the period, around the 4th century AD, led by a decanus or caput contubernii. This officer might be considered roughly as the equivalent of a junior non-commissioned officer. It is possible that the title existed in the late Republic and early Principate. However, there is no evidence of a decanus exercising any kind of battlefield command role, regardless of any responsibilities they may have had in garrison or camp. They were presumably appointed from within the contubernium and were most likely the longest-serving legionary. Their duties would likely have included organising the erection of the marching tent and ensuring their tent-mates kept things tidy.

Two auxiliary "servants", roughly equivalent to modern logistical support troops, were assigned to each contubernium. They were responsible for the care of the contubernium's pack mule, making sure that the legionaries had water during the march, and may have had special skills like blacksmithing or carpentry. However, legionaries often fulfilled specialist roles themselves, so it is quite possible that the support personnel were simply grooms and servants.
