= Centuria =

100-man military unit in Ancient Rome

Centuria (Latin: [kɛn̪ˈt̪ʊria]; pl.: centuriae) is a Latin term (from the stem centum meaning one hundred) denoting military units originally consisting of 100 men. It also means, by extension, the barrack-block occupied by such an unit. The size of the centuria changed over time, and from the first century BC through most of the imperial era the standard size of a centuria was 80 soldiers. By the time of the Roman Empire, ordo became a synonym of centuria (in 4 BC it was used for a maniple). Ten contuberniums formed a century, composed of 80 legionaries. Commanding this unit was the centurion, a veteran expert in combat analogous to a non-commissioned officer. His role was not only that of a leader, but also that of an instructor and responsible for discipline within his unit. The centurion was assisted by the optio, his second-in-command and other officers such as the tesserarius, in charge of security, the signifer, who carried the banner, and the cornicen, who transmitted orders by trumpet.

== Roman use ==
=== Political ===
In the political context the centuria was the constituent voting unit in the assembly of the centuries (Latin: comitia centuriata), an old form of popular assembly in the Roman Republic, the members of which cast one collective vote.

Its origin seems to be the homonymous military unit. The comitia centuriata elected important magistrates like consuls and praetors.

=== Military ===
==== History ====
The centuria dates all the way back to the earliest armies of the Roman Kingdom being described in Plutarch's account of the life of Romulus, however it is only mentioned in passing as a subdivision of Romulus' force. It is speculated that in this period a century may have referred to a Phalanx block and was perhaps the main tactical unit on the battlefield.

After the adoption of the manipular Roman army in 340 BC the centuria took a backseat to the maniple as the main military unit used by the Roman army. In Livy's The History of Rome and Polybius' Histories, centuria do not appear by name but both writers do mention subdivisions of the maniple of around 60 men that centurions commanded. The only point of disagreement between the two was the number of these units in a maniple; Livy says 3, while Polybius says 2. Livy is writing of a time 150 years before Polybius, so the number of men in this unit may have changed over that period.

==== Leadership and organization ====
A century was commanded by a centurion, who was assisted by an optio and tesserarius. It had a banner or signum which was carried by a signifer. Also, each century provided a buccinator, who played a buccina, a kind of horn used to transmit acoustic orders.

On the battlefield, the centurion stood at the far right of the first row of men next to the signifer, while the optio stood at the rear, to avoid, if necessary, the disbanding of the troops and ensure the relay between typical closed order lines used by the Roman army.

The centuria consisted of 80 soldiers. Each contubernium (the minimal unit in the Roman legion) consisted of eight soldiers who lived in the same tent while on campaign or the same bunk room in barracks. The contubernium was accompanied by an unfree attendant.

In the imperial period, but likely not the republican period, the first cohort was twice the size of the other cohorts. Each of its five centuriae was a double centuria of 160 soldiers (rather than 80). The first cohort thus consisted of 1,000 men. Centurions of these first-cohort double centuriae were called primi ordinis ("first rank"), except for the leader of the first centuria of the first cohort, who was referred to as primus pilus (the name denoted the first maniple, Latin: pilus, of the first cohort).

== Other uses ==
The term centuria was later used during the Spanish Civil War to describe the informal bands of local militiamen and international volunteers that sprang up in Catalonia and Aragon in October–November 1936.

== See also ==
- Hundertschaft
- Roman Empire
- Roman military history
- Tactics of the Roman century in combat
- Sotnia

== Sources ==
- Radin, Max (April 1915). "The Promotion of Centurions in Caesar's Army". The Classical Journal. 10 (7): 300–311. JSTOR 3287327.
