= List of Roman taxes =

This is a list of the taxes levied by ancient Rome.

== Land ==
- Tributum soli, the tax on land.

== Trade ==
- Collatio lustralis, was a tax on anyone who makes a product, or provides a service, with the exception of physicians, teachers, and farmers.
- Portoria, was a 2.5% customs tax. It was higher in the Near East.
- Quadragesima Galliarum, was a 2.5% customs tax based in Lugdunum.

== Military ==
- Aes equestre was a tax on orphans (orbi) and widows to pay for the horses of the equus publicus.
- Aes hordearium was a tax on orphans (orbi) and widows or single women (viduae), it was levied to pay for the upkeep of the horses of the equus publicus.

== Marriage ==
- Aes uxorium was a tax on unmarried men and women who could bear children.

== Inheritance ==
- Vicesima hereditatium was a 5% inheritance tax, close relatives were exempt from paying it.

== Sales ==
- Centesima rerum venalium was a tax on goods sold at auction, under Augustus it was a 1% tax, however under Tiberius it was only a 0.5% tax.

== Religious ==
- Fiscus Judaicus was an additional tax for an extra two denarii, it was applied to the Jews in the Roman empire.

== Poll tax ==
- Tributum capitis was a tax on citizens, which only towns with the Jus Italicum were exempt from it.

== Slave taxes ==
- Vicesima libertatis was a tax on owners who freed slaves, the owner would have to pay 5% of the value of the slave.
- Quinta et vicesima venalium mancipiorum was a 4% tax on selling slaves.
- A customs tax on a slave of one and a half denarii is recorded in a third-century tariff list from Zarai.

== State lands ==
- Vectigal was a tax on occupiers of Roman state land (ager publicus).
