= Tributum =

Tax in ancient Rome

In Ancient Rome, Tributum was a tax imposed on the citizenry to fund the costs of war. The Tributum was one of the central reasons for the conducting of the census on assets, as it rose with wealth. It included cash assets, land, property and moveable goods (i.e. slaves). Several types of tributum have been attested to, including tributum in capita, tributum temerarium (emergency levy), and tributum ex censu (amount proportional to citizen's census financial rating).

== Purpose ==
With money as the mainstay of the Roman Republic’s military success, the collection and use of tributum allowed Rome and its allies to pay their soldiers and bestow their armies with food, transport, equipment and support personnel, which effectively enabled Rome’s legions to remain in the field for lengths at a time. Long service, alongside the training undertaken during wartime, allowed legions to cultivate skill at arms and unit cohesion. The development of these skills and not being required to send soldiers home to attend to the agricultural needs of the state ensured many successful military campaigns.

The tributum can not be fully considered a 'tax', as there was an underlying idea that the state could pay it back once military pressure was relieved. There was often an assumption that the military was supported by the monetary gains made in wartime conquests. However, it was very rare that spoils from an army’s victories equaled the money it took to win them – in fact, only half of the campaigns resulting in triumphs produced riches greater than the payments of the involved soldiers.

== Origins ==
The origins of tributum are traditionally linked to the Siege of Veii (406 – 398), in which the fund was used to pay soldiers. The siege was described as a campaign in which the army served for a time longer than usual, which prompted the Senate to decree

'...that the soldiers should receive pay out of the public treasury, whereas up to that period every one had discharged that duty at his own expense.'

— Livy, 4.59

Dionysius also comments on the origins of tributum, however, Mersing (2007, pp. 251) notes that “due to a lack of reliable sources, it is impossible to describe or date with any degree of certainty either the genesis of the system or its subsequent development into the complex structure which Livy and Dionysius describe”. Furthermore, both Dionysius and Livy argue that tributum was an element of the Servian system, with its introduction occurring in the sixth century under Servian reign. This view is not supported, with warfare in Rome's early city-state military service was considered an obligation without remuneration (stipendium) for soldiers. However, tributum and stipendium appear inextricably linked, with Mersing (2007, pp. 231) stating “theoretically, tributum could have existed prior to the war against Veii… the two institutions were so closely connected that imagining the one without the other is hardly feasible”.

== Senate and decree ==
The introduction and the enforcement of tributum relied on decisions made by the Senate. Unlike other Roman taxes, tributum was not established under a binding law but required a senatorial decree to be enforced. Throughout the history of the tax, it had been opposed by plebeians, and incited by tribunes, yet it was the authority of the Senate which saw it enforced, repaid when circumstances changed, and determined depending on the number of soldiers deployed and the material goods they demanded.

== Collection ==
Tributum was not technically a tax in the true sense and was seen as a compulsory loan by the adsidui to fund Rome's military expansion. The assidui were Roman citizens who were eligible for military service because of their wealth but were not conscripted to serve in any particular year. While it was a loan, it was expected to not be repaid, but there were instances of reimbursement after victories, as was the case following the defeat of the Samnites around 293 BCE.

The tributum was paid proportionate to an individual's wealth established by their census group. It was not a flat rate of taxation but was instead determined by Rome's annual military needs. Some years' estimated military costs could be higher than others based on what military operations were to be undertaken in that given year, therefore a fluctuating rate of taxation was needed. This cost would have been divided by the total wealth of the adsidui to establish a rate of taxation for that year. This rate was multiplied by the wealth of each adsiduus to establish the amount of tributum owed by each group respectively. There is little evidence as to who physically collected tributum, but it is believed that the tribuni aerarii were responsible for its collection. Recent attempts to reconstruct the tributum owed in a particular year have been met with difficulty because of the impossibility of accurately calculating the estimated military expenditure for that year, as the cost of the logistical aspects of warfare are too difficult to ascertain.

=== Exemptions ===
While tributum, as with any form of taxation was largely applicable to all, there were some cases in which the collection of tributum was suspended and of citizens being granted immunity and therefore exempt from collection. The collection of tributum was steady and an accepted aspect of civic life, where a brief period of suspension sparked by a significant acquisition of funds rendered tributum superfluous for the following century. After the defeat of Macedon in 167 BCE, Rome began to function without the Tributum because of booty accumulated through battle and the decrease in legions which needed material support. After the death of Julius Caesar, the state demanded increased funds for the civil war and so reintroduced the tributum.

Citizens in the provinces had continued to pay unless they were subject to immunity, as was seen in the case of Egypt, but that did not free them from their obligation to hand in a declaration for the census.

The Roman citizens who qualified to pay tributum were known as assidui; essentially, those who were not serving as legionaries paid for the benefit of those who were. The latter therefore paid no tributum, as otherwise they would have been paying double tax on both money and military service . In terms of exemptions, “those of the last century” (a kind of sixth class below the five property ratings), the proletarii or capite censi, were neither taxed nor liable for military service. This also extended to individuals who did not own property if their lack of contribution to revenue exempted them from paying tributum .

==== Women ====
According to Livy (1857, 24.18.13-15), while women were usually excluded, they voluntarily contributed to tributum during the Second Punic War. The Triumvirs later demanded women paid the tax. Hortensia then argued that women had never paid tax before that point and were not obliged, which resulted in the exemption of most of the 1,400 women who were requested to pay.

== See also ==
- Pay (Roman army)
