= Taxation in ancient Rome =

Tax policies in ancient Rome

In ancient Rome, there were four primary kinds of taxation: a cattle tax, a land tax, customs, and a tax on the profits of any profession. These taxes were typically collected by local aristocrats. The Roman state would set a fixed amount of money each region needed to provide in taxes, and the local officials would decide who paid the taxes and how much they paid. Once collected the taxes would be used to fund the military, create public works, establish trade networks, stimulate the economy, and to fund the cursus publicum.

== Types ==
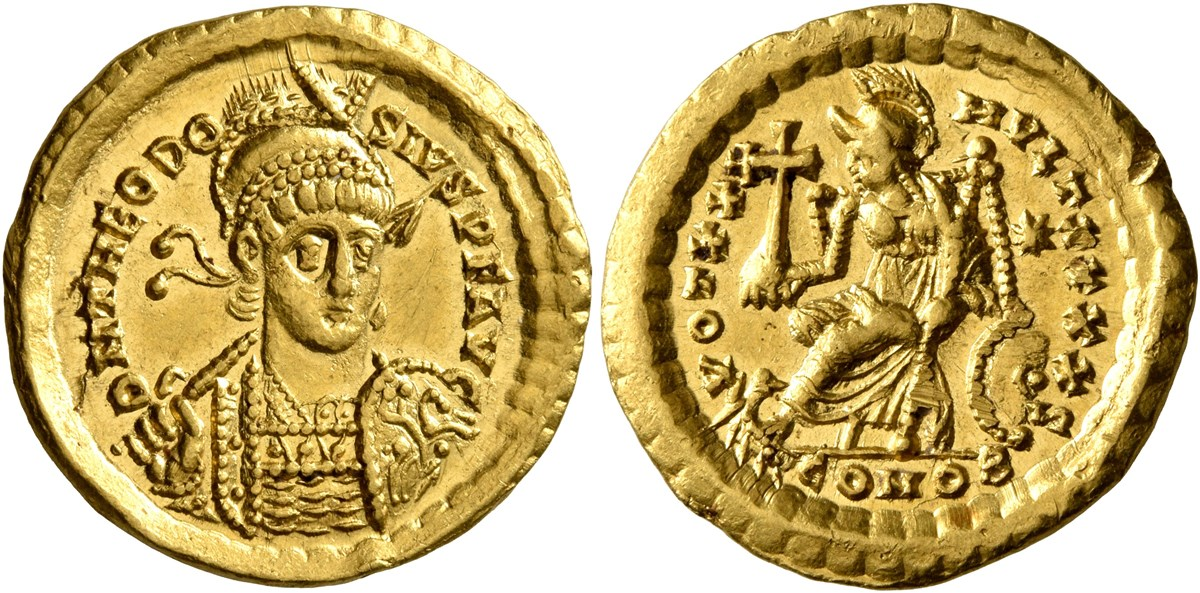
Ancient Roman solidus depicting Theodosius II

The ancient Romans utilized a variety of terms for different types of taxations, including the words "tributa" and "vectigalia." Translators often render these terms as "direct tax" and "indirect tax" respectively, although the scholar Sven Günther suggests that the terms are best differentiated according to their own mode of assessment. Günther states that tributa, alternatively labeled "stipendia," were broadly defined as taxes determined by a census: the term initially referred to a type of tax levied to gather funds during wartime, although it soon came to describe other varieties of taxes assessed according to a census, such as the tributum soli ("land tax"), the tributum capitis ("poll tax"), or the tribute paid by the Roman provinces. The term vectigalia often designated taxes assessed without the usage of a census, such as the portoria ("port tax"), although it developed into a generic term for all varieties of tax. Classicist Peter Brunt argued that the meaning of the term tributum varied throughout Roman history, stating that—during the Republic—it referred to tax levied by a city on its own citizens and—by the principate—became synonymous with the term "stipendium," both words now referring to taxes raised by the imperial administration.

According to Cicero, the stipend stipendium was a fixed ("certum") tax collected in the provinces, with the exception of Sicily. Cicero mentions that it applied to the majority of the Poeni ("Carthaginians") in Africa, leading the historian A.H.M Jones to conclude that the collection of this tax—specifically in Africa—may have been facilitated by the mancipes stipendiorum, a set of public officials mentioned in an African inscription. Livy mentions that the stipendium was established in the year 407 BCE during the war with Veii; he states that the patricians in the Senate decreed that payment shall be provided for Roman soldiers from the coffers of the Senate. Previously, according to Livy, Roman soldiers had financed their own military service. Jones argues that the stipendium likely developed into a provincial tax during the Punic Wars, citing an account from Livy which mentions that—during the campaign in Hispania—the Roman government had difficulty supplying or paying the soldiers, leading Scipio to compensate by exacting funds from the local tributaries.

Cities may have occasionally levied other taxes; however, they were usually temporary. In ancient Rome there was no income tax, instead the primary tax was the portoria. This tax was imposed on goods exiting or entering the city. The size of the tax was based on the value of the item itself. It was higher on luxurious or expensive items, but lower on basic necessities. It was abolished in 60 BCE as it was no longer needed. The Roman empire's increasing size allowed for the government to procure sufficient funds from tributaries. Roman veterans were exempt from paying the portoria tax. Augustus created the vicesima hereditatium and the centesima. The vicesima was an inheritance tax and the centesima was a sales tax on auctions. Both policies were unpopular. They were designed to fund the aerarium militare, which was a service that provided money to veterans. Caligula abolished the centesima rerum venalium on account of its unpopularity. Caracalla granted Roman citizenship to all male residents of the empire, which was likely a method of increasing the taxable population of the empire. Under Constantine, it had become difficult to pay taxes due to the continued debasement of the solidus, increasing the prevalence of payment in kind.

== Collection and management ==
=== Administration ===
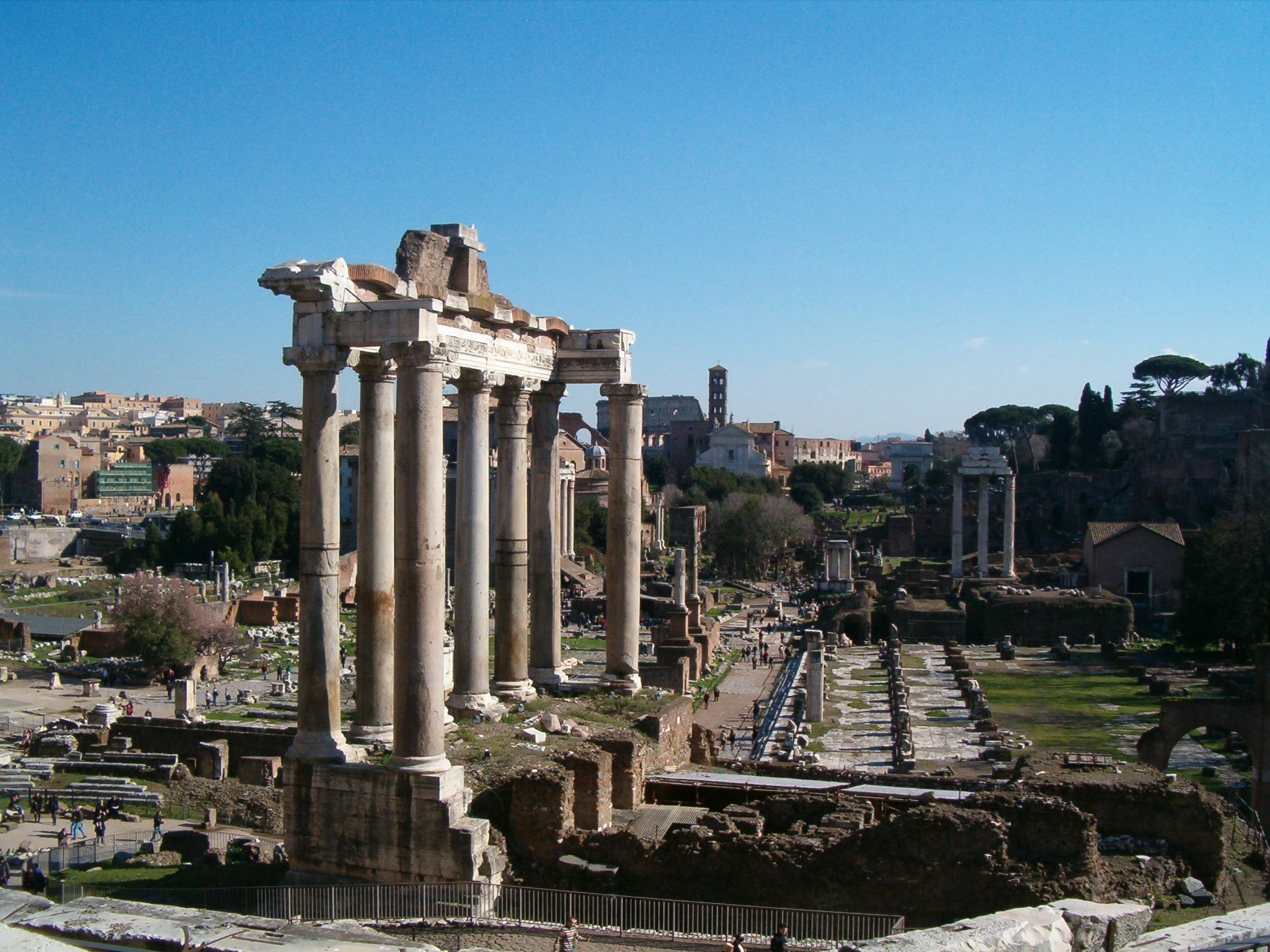
The Temple of Saturn, a religious monument that housed the treasury in ancient Rome

Ancient Roman tax systems were regressive, they applied a heavier tax burden on lower income levels and reduced taxation on wealthier social classes. In ancient Rome, taxation was primarily levied upon the provincial population who lived outside of Italy. Direct taxes on Italian land were abolished in 167 BCE and indirect taxes on certain transactions were removed in 60 BCE. The urbanized, populous, and important city of Rome possibly had greater influence on politics than the more dispersed and less prominent provincial population.

Taxation in ancient Rome was decentralized, with the government preferring to leave the task of collecting taxes to local elected magistrates. Typically these magistrates were wealthy landowners. During the Roman Republic finances were stored inside the temple of Saturn. Under the reign of Augustus a new institution was created: the fiscus. At first it only contained the wealth gained through taxes on Egypt; but it expanded to other sources later in Roman history. It also collected wealth from people who died without a will, half of the wealth of unclaimed property, and fines.

The ancient Roman census, as administered by the censors, was important for the administration of taxes in ancient Rome. The results of their periodic census determined the amount of tax a citizen owed. They registered the value of each citizen's property, which determined the amount of property tax they had to pay. In Roman Egypt, Greeks were entitled to reduced taxation compared to other people in Egypt. These Greco-Egyptian persons were likely the members of a special social group referenced in other Roman documents called hoi apo tou gymnasiou, meaning "gymnasial group." Difficulty identifying which members of the Egyptian populace were entitled to reduced taxation likely prompted a special census of these groups in the year 4 or 5 CE. Following this census, the number of gymnasial groups per nome was limited to one and future members of gymnasial groups were required to prove their genealogy. The censors also participated in tax farming through their auctions; they auctioned off the space of a lustrum to the highest bidder in return for tithes and taxes. Censors had similar duties to a modern minister of finance. They could impose new vectiglia, sell government land, and manage the budget.

The 1st-century land surveyor Hyginus Gromaticus provides a description of land tax in ancient Rome, noting that there existed two varieties of land: ager immunis ("land exempt from taxes") and ager vectigalis ("taxable land"). Hyginus mentions that the rules for taxation varied across provinces, stating—in some editions of the text—that in some provinces the tax paid using either one-fifth or one-eighth of the crop yield and other provinces paid using money. However, other manuscripts read "now many [pay] in money" instead of utilizing the word "alii" ("others"); historian Keith Hopkins favors the latter rendition, arguing the former derives from scribal error. He further mentions that these types of were categorized in various groups and valued based upon their alignment, noting that—in Pannonia—land was grouped into meadows ("prati"), pasture ("pasucae"), glandiferous trees ("silvae glandiferae"); common trees ("silvae vulgares"); and first- and second-class arable land ("arvi primi and secundi"). According to Hyginus, this land was taxed iugerum (jugerum, roughly 2/3 of an acre) according to their productivity and that disputes regarding the measurement of the land, and therefore the size of the tax burden, were frequent. Cicero describes a unique system of land tax in Sicily, mentioning that—as Sicily was, according to Cicero, a particularly valuable province—the Romans refrained from altering the preexisting tax policy of the region or imposing new taxes to ensure the loyalty of the local Sicilian population following Roman conquest. According to Cicero, this tax system ensured that the auctioning of the rights to collect land taxes would occur according to the previous laws of lex Hieronica, the set of laws instituted by Hiero II of Syracuse. He notes that several cities in Sicily are exempt from taxation by the Roman government due to special treaties, these being Tauromenium, Centuripa, Segesta, Halaesus, Halyciae, Panormus, and Messina. Within his speech, In Verrem ("Against Verres"), Cicero criticizes Verres, the propraetor (governor) of Sicily, for supposedly altering the tax code, an action Cicero deemed an abuse of power.

The emperor Diocletian changed the method of collecting taxes in ancient Rome. He replaced the local curial class with a bureaucracy. He established a new tax system known as the Capitatio-Iugatio to try to combat the rampant inflation of that time. This system combined the land rents, known as iugatio, and the capitatio, which affected individuals. Under this policy, arable land was divided into different regions according to their yield and crop. All land, income, and direct taxes were merged into a single tax. This policy tied the peasantry to their land, and those without land were taxed. Diocletian instituted the aurum oblaticium and the aurum coronarium which taxed landowning senators. He also taxed businessmen with a new tax called the collatio lustralis. These policies contributed to an improved accounting system for the Late Roman Empire. In the province of Syria Palaestina, taxation boundaries were formalized by inscribed boundary stones erected under Diocletian, which named villages and the officials responsible for surveying them.

==== Tax debt ====
Throughout Roman history, significant tax-debt may have accumulated as issues such as a poor harvest could prevent civilians from fully paying the tax burden. Tax documents from Egypt list numerous tax titles, many of which were either only paid in-part or had not been paid at all: Two lists dated to 51 CE show debts set to have been paid by 46 or 47 CE and another list concerning Philadelphia, dated to the reign of Claudius, mentions 122 tax payments of which only 64 were fully paid while 36 had noting paid and 22 had only been partially paid. Emperors, possibly as political gestures, sometimes forgave tax-debts: Marcus Aurelius in 178 CE forgave all tax arrears incurred over the past 45 years and Trajan burned fiscal records documenting unpaid taxes in a bonfire during his triumph commemorating his victory in the Dacian Wars, from which Trajan may have garnered the wealth to afford such a financial decision. Likewise, in 118 CE—during the beginning of his reign—Hadrian burned more than 900 million sesterces of arrears in a large bonfire in Trajan's Forum. According to the 4th-century Roman historian Ammianus Marcellinus, Julian the Apostate halted the practice of writing off tax debt due to its disproportionately negative effects on the poorer population, who were "generally known" to have been forced to "pay [taxes] in full without easement."

==== Tax farming ====
Tax farming is a financial management technique in which a legal contract assigns the management of a revenue source to a third party while the original holder of the revenue stream receives fixed periodic rents from the contractor. This practice was first developed by the Romans. Under their system, the Roman State reassigned the power to collect taxes to private individuals or organizations. These private groups paid the taxes for the area, and they used the products and money that could be garnered from the area to cover the outlay. Tax farmers may have been tasked with collecting as much wealth in taxes as possible, with their only limit being the local political rulers who wanted to avoid the potential negative effects of overexploitation on future revenue. During wartime, Publicani supplied the Roman military using their own personal resources. They would make profit by collecting taxes on the local populace. This tax would be collected by local municipal councils. If the council failed to fulfill the quota, a not uncommon occurrence, the fiscus would provide the publican with the uncollected quantity of wealth and place the council in debt for the expense. Systems of tax farming may have proliferated in ancient Rome due to benefits it provided to the aristocracy of the ancient Roman world, who were not subject to the same high levels of taxation as the rest of the populace.

By the time of the Roman Empire these private people or groups had become known as the publicani. Although Augustus limited the power of the publicani significantly, the Roman government assumed control of farming indirect taxes under the Flavian dynasty. By Trajan's reign they controlled the collection of all vectigalia in all regions except Syria, Egypt and Judea.

According to the classicists Roscoe Pulliam and Keith Hopkins, the prevalence of self-assessment in the administration of Roman taxation may have created discrepancies between the quantity of funds levied by tax collectors and the finances that reached the Imperial treasury. They note that, despite numerous reports of inordinately high tax rates, the expenditure of the Roman government was likely relatively small compared to a modern state: Rome provided little funding for welfare services or local administration, with no funds dedicated to institutions such as public education. This analysis is favored by Keith Hopkins, who estimated that Roman taxes likely constituted—on average—around 5-7% of the GDP of the empire, who also suggests that this may have originated from a lack of significant public services offered to governed regions. Hopkins proposes that Roman involvement in provincial administration may have been restricted to the provision of military defense, limited law enforcement, and minor investments in local infrastructure. Pulliam and Hopkins attribute this phenomenon to the contracted tax collectors in the Roman empire: Local leaders, who were often wealthy and influential landowners, may have chosen to levy higher taxes on less powerful individuals of lower strata and to minimize the burden imposed upon themselves.

=== Indiction ===
The indiction was a periodic reassessment for agricultural taxes and land taxes used throughout Roman history. During the Roman Republic this easement occurred every five years; later during the empire the cycle lasted 15 years, although in Roman Egypt a 14-year cycle was used. If the emperors made any change to the tax policy it usually occurred at the beginning of these cycles, and at the end it was common for the Emperors to forgive any arrears.

The Chronicon Paschale, a 7th-century Greek Christian chronicle, claims that this system was established in 49 BCE by Julius Caesar, although it is also possible it began in 48 BC. It also may have begun in 58 CE when Nero issued a series of tax reforms. The earliest known event associated with this cycle was in 42 CE, when Claudius established a board of praetors to pursue arrears for it. The cycle in Egypt only lasted fourteen years because in Egypt the liability for the poll tax began at the age of fourteen.

== Usage and effects ==
Throughout much of Roman history the tax burden was almost exclusively laid on the poorest people of the Empire while wealthier bureaucrats could avoid taxation. These systems may have contributed to the concentration of wealth and land in the hands of a small class of aristocrats. Excessive taxation may also have limited the ability of provinces such as Egypt to provide goods to customers. Taxpayer money was often abused in ancient Rome. Instead of funding public projects or internal improvements, it was often used for the more selfish pursuits of bureaucrats. Hopkins argues that the tax collection systems of the Roman Empire funneled wealth into an aristocratic class, which was then primarily used to fund the Roman military and to maintain the luxurious lifestyle of Roman elites. Emperor Julian stopped the city of Corinth from taxing the city of Argos, over which they had been given some power, and using that money to fund wild beast hunts.

During the late Roman empire the level of taxation progressively needed to increase as the Roman empire needed to continue funding the military. Most of the responsibility for taxation fell on the lower classes and especially the farmers. Bureaucrats used their position of authority to evade taxes, leaving the burden of taxation on the poorer citizens. By now, taxes consumed enough produce to risk the peasants survival. Emperor Constantine refused to place the empire's revenue back into circulation, thus hurting the economy, and forcing farmers to sell their goods at low prices due to the emperor's economic policies. Preventing them from gathering the funds necessary to meet the high tax burden. People who were unable to bear this burden would have agreed to become indebted to landlords in exchange for protection, effectively transforming them from free citizens into serfs. The poor flocked to these estates, and as they grew the usage of money became increasingly rarer. This crippled the economy and the ability of the military to gather the necessary funds and manpower. The poverty-stricken lower class often turned towards crime.

Heavy taxation made the Roman government appear as oppressors, possibly contributing to the loss of provinces such as Africa. Germanic incursions forced the emperors to lower tax rates in the year 413. The government of Rome also decreed that for five years, the tax rate of Italy was reduced by 80%. Despite these reductions, the provinces of Rome struggled to pay their taxes, and the Roman government was unable to receive the funding it needed. Increased levels of inflation reduced the value of the money the government received in taxation. The difficulties in receiving proper tax funds impaired the Roman state's ability to adequately fund the army. Most Late Roman tax money was used to pay off Germanic peoples.

=== Impact on trade ===
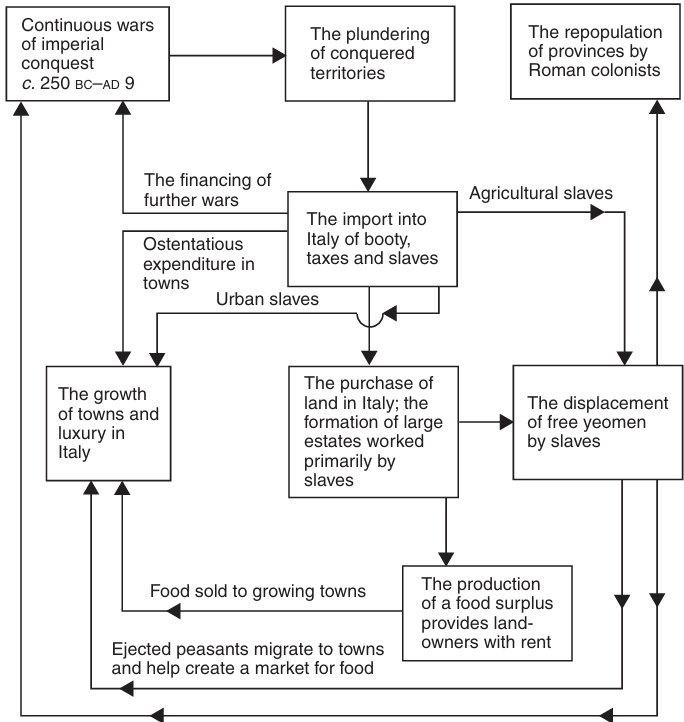
Model, created by Keith Hopkins, which depicts the various factors—including taxation—that he argues contributed to urbanization in ancient Rome

Keith Hopkins suggested that taxation may have aided the growth of trade networks in the Roman Empire by helping to create an interconnected economy in which, through taxation, finances were collected from the provinces and spent in Italy or the frontier regions, and provinces were forced to increase production to recover their lost wealth. On a local level agrarian workers were forced to produce surpluses of food and sell these goods at local markets to artisans, who would also have been forced to expand production in response to taxation. On a larger scale, regions such as Syria or Greece—which primarily exported taxes—may have been compelled to engage in long-distance trade, exporting locally made products to tax-consuming provinces such as Italy, to compensate for the funds lost through taxation. These products, according to Hopkins, typically would have arrived in markets within the city of Rome itself, due to the immense size of the urban population and, therefore, the market. Reciprocally, participation in these markets may have helped provide a source of income for other cities and settlements throughout the empire, thereby helping to maintain and spur economic development in these areas. Furthermore, the growth of towns may have partially resulted from towns acting as markets through which goods could be processed, crafted, or traded before being exported to larger markets across the Empire. Alongside these changes, government employees, officials, and soldiers would have received tax money as pay and would have spent that money on services and goods, some of which may have originated from the province in which the tax money was collected.

Hopkins proposes that, although there were numerous other factors motivating Roman economic growth, cumulatively, these systems resulted in the expansion of trade networks, the growth of local markets, and increased urbanization. Another factor potentially impacting the economy in a similar manner was rent collection: the burden of rent—according to Hopkins—may also have also driven farmers to increase production to satisfy financial demands. These rents would have been collected by wealthy landlords, who would have spent that money in cities and other areas distant from the original source of the funds. This system may have also functioned even if the taxes were paid in-kind: materials collected in-kind could eventually reach the larger trade-networks of the Roman Empire if they were sold to merchants, who would then sell the goods to other consumers. For instance, in Egypt farmers supplied portions of their crop yield in tax to the rest of the Roman Empire, where it would then be sold to the populace in other regions and therefore converted into monetary wealth.

However, Hopkins suggests that taxes paid in-kind were often unable to stimulate economic development as they were less likely to be reintroduced into the economy. Hopkins argues that the prevalence of taxes paid in-kind during the 3rd-century was both caused by and contributed to the economic depression of the that time period; the collapse of the fiscal system may have forced the government to adopt taxes paid in-kind, and—in doing so—they possibly crippled the aforementioned system of trade propagated by taxation. Whereas taxes collected in money may force individuals to earn money through trade (i.e. farmers selling surplus food to a craftsman who produces their own goods), thereby stimulating local and long-distance markets, taxes collected in-kind require no such transformation. These taxes were, according to Hopkins, often exclusively used to supply nearby military forces and therefore lacked the same implications for long-distance trade or ability to be reinvested into the economy. Furthermore, Hopkins suggests that the increased bureaucracy of collecting and managing in-kind goods instead of currency liked served as an added drained on the economy.

=== Impact on agriculture ===
The Codex Theodosianus, a 4th-century Roman legal code, documents several laws that provided tax-exempt status to land for the purpose of incentivizing agricultural work on such land. One law, issued on October 13, 320, granted tax-exempt lands to veterans; another law, issued on September 21, 440, offered tax relief for individuals who worked previously uncultivated or deserted land. Temporary tax exemptions may also have been issued to alleviate financial burdens in response to unique situations such as devastation from war, with one text from the Theodosian Code mentioning the temporary reduction of taxes in African cities for the purpose of aiding these settlements in affording restorations for defensive fortifications. These tax reductions may have been partially motivated by political rather than economic concerns: One law dated to March 24, 390 offers tax-exemption for Campania under the condition that the province cease all complaints regarding abandoned land. According to the classicist Cam Grey, this legislation may have served to earn political favor with emphyteutic land-owners, who may have typically been wealthy and influential individuals that had been leased agrarian land for the purpose of cultivation.

Authors from Late Antiquity sometimes claim that high levels of taxation motivated the depopulation of land across the Empire, with the 4th-century Greek rhetorician Libanius mentioning "Nowadays, though, you can go through miles of deserted farmland. The burden of taxation has emptied it." According to Jones, it is also possible that these grievances may have stemmed more from a general dislike of all changes to the existing tax structure as opposed to a genuinely severe financial burden. For instance, the 3rd-century Christian author Lactantius argues that tax rates under Diocletian were unbearably high but the 5th-century Epitome de Caesaribus claims that taxation under Diocletian was "modestia tolerabilis" ("tolerable moderation") while the taxation of its time had progress into "perniciem" ("ruin," "devastation"). The scholar C.R. Whittaker argues that, even if these assertions bore some validity, they were certainly not applicable the entirety of the Empire. During the lifetime of Libanius, the same period in which he describes in economic depression around Cyprus and Antioch, there may have been an economic boom in Syria. These authors may have been further biased by their religious views: The Epitome de Caesaribus was likely written by a pagan, who may have been reminiscing upon the prior pagan period under the pagan emperor, Diocletian, while the Christian author Lactantius may have opposed Diocletian partially out of condemnation for the original religion of the Roman Empire. In other ancient sources, accusations of demanding excessive taxes or praise for lowering tax rates were used by the political enemies or allies of Roman political figures to either besmirch or ennoble their legacy. For instance, the 4th-century author Ammianus Marcellinus wrote that Constantine—and his successor, Constantius II—began implementing exorbitantly high tax demands, with the upper-class of Rome under Constantius II supposedly becoming "inflamed with a boundless eagerness for riches." In contrast, authors such as Eusebius—who expressed more favorable attitudes towards Constantine—claimed that the emperor reduced the land tax 25%, with a further 20% reduction on the lands of the Aedui.

Whittaker suggests that the evidence for the pervasiveness of the supposed "agri deserti" ("deserted land") is scant and almost exclusively attested in sources of dubious reliability, casting doubt upon the notion that this issue was endemic to the Late Empire. Furthermore, an analysis of evidence for demographic changes in the Gallo-Roman countryside compelled the classicists Paul Van Ossel and Pierre Ouzoulias to suggest that there is little archaeological evidence for the impoverishment of the Roman countryside. The authors noted—among other sources—the presence of indicators of wealth throughout Late Antique tombs from the countryside, such a large number of lavish sarcophagi with expensive ornaments such as jewelry. Jones, however, maintains that over taxation of the peasantry likely contributed to rural depopulation in Late Empire, arguing that the poorest Romans were unable to utilize political influence or wealth to circumvent or bribe tax collectors as wealthier individuals were, thereby rendering the poor subject to the excessive collection that eventually increased poverty. Furthermore, Jones argues that the systems of tax collection themselves were biased against those of lower economic strata, suggesting that land tax may have been calculated based upon an aggregation of land size and inhabitants, leading individuals with large estates but small families to potentially pay less than individuals with little land but numerous dependents.

== Bibliography ==
- Brunt, P. A. (1981). Neesen, Lutz (ed.). "The Revenues of Rome". The Journal of Roman Studies. 71: 161–172. doi:10.2307/299505. ISSN 0075-4358. JSTOR 299505.
- DeLorme, Charles D.; Isom, Stacey; Kamerschen, David R. (10 April 2005). "Rent seeking and taxation in the Ancient Roman Empire". Applied Economics. 37 (6): 705–711. doi:10.1080/0003684042000323591. ISSN 0003-6846.
- Duncan-Jones, Richard (1994). Money and Government in the Roman Empire. Cambridge University Press. ISBN 978-0-521-44192-6.
- Duncan-Jones, Richard (1990). Structure and Scale in the Roman Economy. Cambridge University Press. ISBN 978-0-521-35477-6.
- Grey, Cam (2007). "Revisiting the 'problem' of agri deserti in the Late Roman Empire". Journal of Roman Archaeology. 20: 362–376. doi:10.1017/S1047759400005468. ISSN 1047-7594.
- Günther, Sven (7 April 2016). "Taxation in the Greco-Roman World: The Roman Principate". Oxford Handbook Topics in Classical Studies. Oxford University Press. doi:10.1093/oxfordhb/9780199935390.013.38. ISBN 978-0-19-993539-0.
- Hopkins, Keith (15 March 2002). "Rome, Taxes, Rents and Trade". The Ancient Economy. Edinburgh University Press. pp. 190–230. doi:10.1515/9781474472326-016. ISBN 978-1-4744-7232-6.
- Hopkins, Keith (2017a). "Economic Growth and Towns in Classical Antiquity". In Kelly, Christopher; Hopkins, Keith (eds.). Sociological Studies in Roman History. Cambridge Classical Studies. Cambridge: Cambridge University Press. pp. 135–159. doi:10.1017/CBO9781139093552.007. ISBN 978-1-107-01891-4.
- Hopkins, Keith (2017b). "Taxes and Trade in the Roman Empire (200 BC–AD 400)". In Kelly, Christopher; Hopkins, Keith (eds.). Sociological Studies in Roman History (PDF). Cambridge Classical Studies. Cambridge: Cambridge University Press. pp. 160–212. doi:10.1017/CBO9781139093552.008. ISBN 978-1-107-01891-4.
- Jones, Arnold Hugh Martin (1974). The Roman economy; Studies in Ancient Economic and Administrative History. Rowman and Littlefield. ISBN 978-0-87471-194-3.
- MacMullen, Ramsay (1987). "Tax-Pressure in the Roman Empire". Latomus. 46 (4): 737–754. ISSN 0023-8856. JSTOR 41534652.
- Pulliam, Roscoe (1924). "Taxation in the Roman State". The Classical Journal. 19 (9): 545–553. ISSN 0009-8353. JSTOR 3289068.
- van Ossel, Paul; Ouzoulias, Pierre (2000). "Rural settlement economy in Northern Gaul in the Late Empire: an overview and assessment". Journal of Roman Archaeology. 13: 133–160. doi:10.1017/S104775940001881X. ISSN 1047-7594 – via Cambridge Core.
- Whittaker, C. R. (1976). "Agri Deserti". In Finley, Moses I. (ed.). Studies in Roman Property. Cambridge Classical Studies. Cambridge: Cambridge University Press. pp. 137–166. doi:10.1017/CBO9781107297920.009. ISBN 978-0-521-21115-4.
