= Manumission =

Act of an enslaver freeing the persons they enslaved

1883 letter in Brazil specifying the slave Geraldo, belonging to Antônio Joaquim de Souza Costa, will be free with the condition of working for another 6 years. Brazil would abolish slavery nationwide in 1888.

Manumission, enfranchisement, or franchisement is the act of freeing slaves by their owners. Different approaches to manumission were developed, each specific to the time and place of a particular society. Historian Verene Shepherd states that the most widely used term is gratuitous manumission, "the conferment of freedom on the enslaved by enslavers before the end of the slave system".

The motivations for manumission were complex and varied. Firstly, it may present itself as a sentimental and benevolent gesture. One typical scenario was the freeing in the master's will of a devoted servant after long years of service. A trusted bailiff might be manumitted as a gesture of gratitude. For those working as agricultural labourers or in workshops, there was little likelihood of being so noticed. In general, it was more common for older slaves to be given freedom.

Legislation under the early Roman Empire put limits on the number of slaves that could be freed in wills (lex Fufia Caninia, 2 BC), which suggests that it had been widely used. Freeing slaves could serve the pragmatic interests of the owner. The prospect of manumission worked as an incentive for slaves to be industrious and compliant. Manumission contracts, found in some abundance at Delphi (Greece), specify in detail the prerequisites for liberation.

== Ancient Greece ==
A History of Ancient Greece explains that in the context of Ancient Greece, affranchisement came in many forms. A master choosing to free his slave would most likely do so only "at his death, specifying his desire in his will". In rare cases, slaves who were able to earn enough money in their labour were able to buy their own freedom and were known as choris oikointes. Two 4th-century bankers, Pasion and Phormion, had been slaves before they bought their freedom. A slave could also be sold fictitiously to a sanctuary from where a god could enfranchise him. In very rare circumstances, the city could affranchise a slave. A notable example is that Athens liberated everyone who was present at the Battle of Arginusae (406 BC).

Even once a slave was freed, he was not generally permitted to become a citizen, but would become a metic. The master then became the metic's prostatès (guarantor or guardian). The former slave could be bound to some continuing duty to the master and was commonly required to live near the former master (paramone). Ex-slaves were able to own property outright, and their children were free of all constraint.

== Ancient Rome ==
Under Roman law, a slave had no personhood and was protected under law mainly as his or her master's property. A slave who had been manumitted was a libertus (feminine liberta) and a citizen. Manumissions were subject to a state tax.

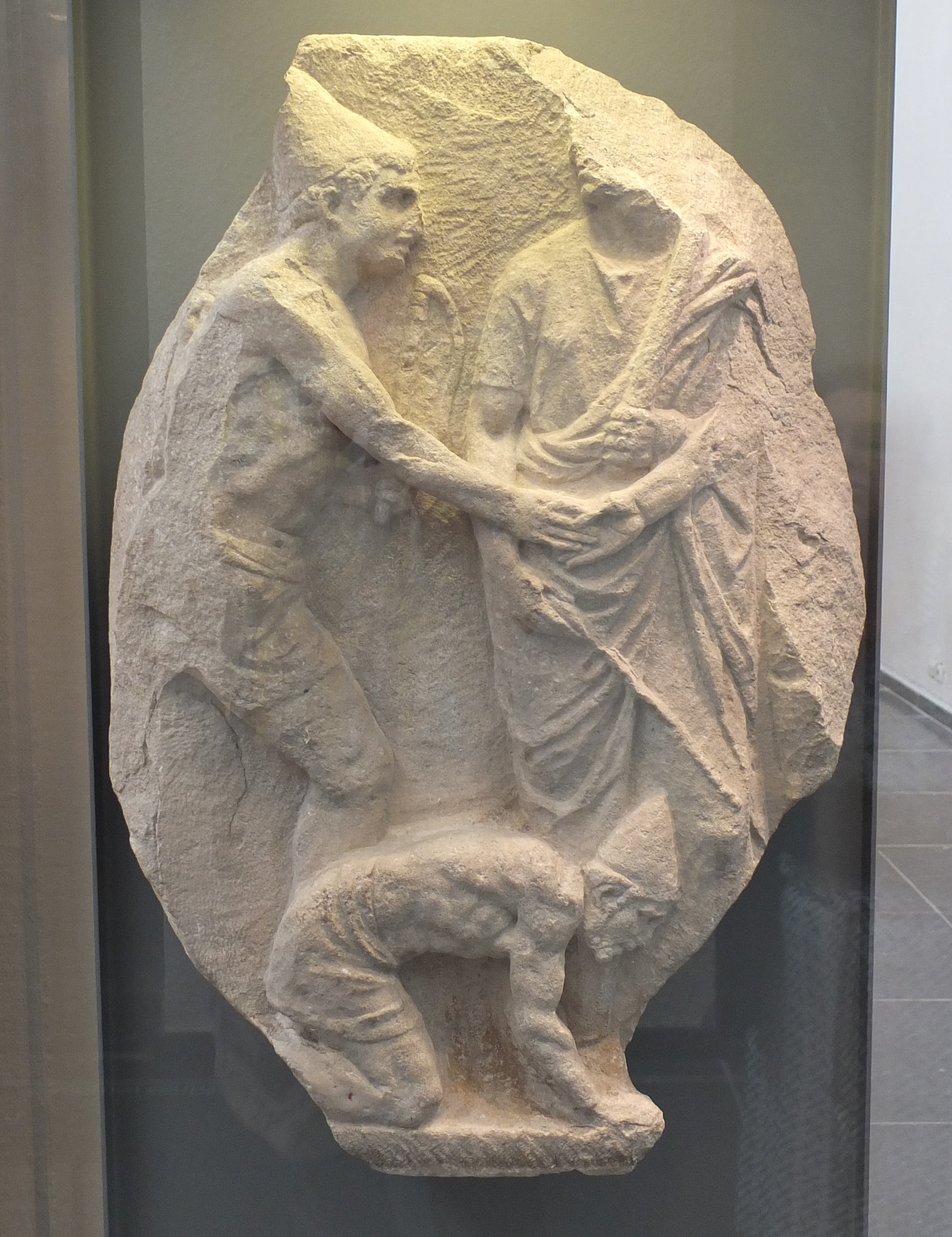
Relief depicting the manumission of two slaves, with pileus hats (1st century BC, Musée royal de Mariemont, Belgium.

The soft felt pileus hat was a symbol of the freed slave and manumission; slaves were not allowed to wear them:

Among the Romans the cap of felt was the emblem of liberty. When a slave obtained his freedom he had his head shaved, and wore instead of his hair an undyed pileus (πίλεον λευκόν, Diodorus Siculus Exc. Leg. 22 p625, ed. Wess.; Plaut. Amphit. I.1.306; Persius, V.82). Hence the phrase servos ad pileum vocare is a summons to liberty, by which slaves were frequently called upon to take up arms with a promise of liberty (Liv. XXIV.32). "The figure of Liberty on some of the coins of Antoninus Pius, struck A.D. 145, holds this cap in the right hand".

The cap was an attribute carried by Libertas, the Roman goddess of freedom, who was also recognized by the rod (vindicta or festuca), used ceremonially in the act of manumissio vindicta, Latin for "freedom by the rod" (emphasis added):

The master brought his slave before the magistratus, and stated the grounds (causa) of the intended manumission. "The lictor of the magistratus laid a rod (festuca) on the head of the slave, accompanied with certain formal words, in which he declared that he was a free man ex Jure Quiritium", that is, "vindicavit in libertatem". The master in the meantime held the slave, and after he had pronounced the words "hunc hominem liberum volo," he turned him round (momento turbinis exit Marcus Dama, Persius, Sat. V.78) and let him go (emisit e manu, or misit manu, Plaut. Capt. II.3.48), whence the general name of the act of manumission. The magistratus then declared him to be free [...]

A freed slave customarily took the former owner's family name, which was the nomen (see Roman naming conventions) of the master's gens. The former owner became the patron (patronus) and the freed slave became a client (cliens) and retained certain obligations to the former master, who owed certain obligations in return. A freed slave could also acquire multiple patrons.

A freed slave became a citizen. Not all citizens, however, held the same freedoms and privileges. In particular contrast, women could become citizens, but female Roman citizenship did not allow anywhere near the same protections, independence, or rights as men, either in the public or private spheres. In reflection of unwritten, yet strictly enforced contemporary social codes, women were also legally prevented from participating in public and civic society. For example: through the illegality of women voting or holding public office.

The freed slaves' rights were limited or defined by particular statutes. A freed male slave could become a civil servant but not hold higher magistracies (see, for instance, apparitor and scriba), serve as priests of the emperor or hold any of the other highly respected public positions.

If they were sharp at business, however, there were no social limits to the wealth that freedmen could amass. Their children held full legal rights, but Roman society was stratified. Famous Romans who were the sons of freedmen include the Augustan poet Horace and the 2nd century emperor, Pertinax.

A freedman in Latin literature is Trimalchio, the nouveau riche character in the Satyricon, by Petronius.

== Peru ==
In colonial Peru, the laws around manumission were influenced by the Siete Partidas, a Castilian law code. According to the Siete Partidas, masters who manumitted their slaves should be honored and obeyed by their former slaves for giving such a generous gift. As in other parts of Latin America under the system of coartación, slaves could purchase their freedom by negotiating with their master for a purchase price and this was the most common way for slaves to be freed. Manumission also occurred during baptism, or as part of an owner's last will and testament.

In baptismal manumission, enslaved children were freed at baptism. Many of these freedoms came with stipulations which could include servitude often until the end of an owner's life. Children freed at baptism were also frequently the children of still-enslaved parents. A child who was freed at baptism but continued to live with enslaved family was far more likely to be re-enslaved. Baptismal manumission could be used as evidence of a person's freed status in a legal case but they did not always have enough information to serve as a carta de libertad.

Female slave owners were more likely than males to manumit their slaves at baptism. The language used by women slave owners who freed their slaves also differed substantially from that of men, with many women using the phrasing “for the love I have for her” as well as other expressions of intimacy as part of the reasoning for freeing their slaves as written on the baptismal record or carta de libertad. Male slave owners were far less likely to speak in intimate terms about their reasoning for freeing their slaves.

Many children manumitted at baptism were likely the illegitimate children of their male owners, though this can be difficult to determine from the baptismal record and must be assessed through other evidence. Although slave owners often characterized these baptismal manumissions as a result of their generous beneficence, there are records of payments by parents or godparents to ensure the child's freedom. Mothers were almost never manumitted alongside their children, even when the mothers gave birth to their master's own children. Manumitting a slave's children at baptism could be one way for owners to ensure the loyalty of the children's still-enslaved parents.

Enslaved people could also be freed as part of a slave owner's last will and testament. Testamentary manumission frequently involved expressions of affection on the part of the slave owner to the enslaved person as part of the rationale behind manumission. Slave owners also frequently cited a desire to die with a clear conscience as part of their reasoning for freeing their slaves. Testamentary manumission could often be disputed by heirs claiming fraud, or that an enslaved person had preyed upon a relative's weak mental or physical condition. Legally testamentary manumissions were usually respected by the courts, who understood enslaved people as part of their owner's property to distribute as they wished. Relatives who claimed fraud had to provide evidence of their claims or they would be dismissed. As in baptismal manumission, conditions of ongoing servitude were sometimes placed upon the enslaved person, by obligating them to care for another relative.

In Iberoamerican law, a person had discretion over one-fifth of their estate with the rest going to children, spouses, and other relatives. An enslaved person could be sold in order to cover debts of the estate, but not if they had already paid part of their purchase price towards manumission as this was considered a legally binding agreement. As long as a person had not disinherited his children or spouse, a slave owner could manumit their slaves as they wished.

== Caribbean ==
Manumission laws varied between the various colonies in the Caribbean. For instance, the island of Barbados had some of the strictest laws, requiring owners to pay £200 for male slaves and £300 for female slaves, and show cause to the authorities. In some other colonies, no fees applied. It was not uncommon for ex-slaves to purchase family members or friends in order to free them. For example, ex-slave Susannah Ostrehan became a successful businesswoman in Barbados and purchased many of her acquaintances.

For Jamaica, manumission went largely unregulated until the 1770s, when manumitters had to post a bond in order to ensure those that they freed did not become wards of the parish. One quantitative analysis of the Jamaica manumission deeds shows that manumission was comparatively rare on the island around 1770, with only an estimated 165 slaves winning their freedom through this fashion. While manumission had little demographic impact on the size of the enslaved population, it was important to the growth and development of the free population of colour, in Jamaica, during the second half of the eighteenth century.

In Haiti, before the Haitian Revolution, which freed all Enslaved Afro-Latinos, there was a struggle for many formerly enslaved individuals to maintain their freedom through official manumission papers. Some, like Rosalie of the Poulard Nation, went through various ways to prove her freedom, and that of her children, such as having her white husband claim her as a slave and declare them as free in 1803, although she was initially freed by her owner in 1795.

== France ==
By the edict of 3 July 1315, the King of France, Louis X, known as the Quarrelsome, affirmed that "according to the law of nature, everyone must be born free" and that "throughout our kingdom, servants will be brought to freedom". Hence the maxim "no one is a slave in France" and the statement "the soil of France frees the slave who touches it". This edict thus abolished serfdom (from the Latin word servus, slave) in the royal domain. The Law of February 1794 was a decree of the French First Republic's National Convention which abolished slavery in the French colonial empire.

== United States ==
African slaves were freed in the North American colonies as early as the 17th century. Some, such as Anthony Johnson, went on to become landowners and slaveholders themselves. Slaves could sometimes arrange manumission by agreeing to "purchase themselves" by paying the master an agreed amount. Some masters demanded market rates; others set a lower amount in consideration of service. Reytory Angola, herself a freed slave, was the first Black person to individually petition a legislature when she requested the manumission of her enslaved adopted son in New Amsterdam in 1661.

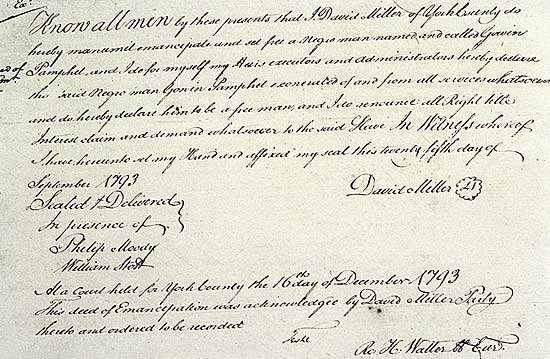
Original manumission for Gowan Pamphlet of the Colony of Virginia, which freed him from slavery. Signed by his owner, David Miller. c. 1793.

Regulation of manumission began in 1692, when Virginia established that to manumit a slave, a person must pay the cost for them to be transported out of the colony. A 1723 law stated that slaves may not "be set free upon any pretence whatsoever, except for some meritorious services to be adjudged and allowed by the governor and council".

In some cases, a master who was drafted into the army would send a slave instead, with a promise of freedom if he survived the war. The new government of Virginia repealed the laws in 1782, and declared freedom for slaves who had fought for the colonies during the American Revolutionary War of 1775–1783. Another law passed in 1782 permitted masters to free their slaves of their own accord. Previously, a manumission had required obtaining consent from the state legislature, an arduous process which was rarely successful.

As the population of free Negroes increased, the Virginia legislature passed laws forbidding them from moving into the state (1778), and requiring newly freed slaves to leave the Commonwealth within one year unless special permission was granted (1806).

In the Upper South in the late 18th century, planters had less need for slaves, as they switched from labour-intensive tobacco cultivation to mixed-crop farming. Slave states such as Virginia made it easier for slaveholders to free their slaves. From 1791 the Virginian Robert Carter III (1728–1804) emancipated almost 500 slaves. In the two decades after the American Revolutionary War, so many slaveholders accomplished manumissions by deed or in wills that the proportion of free black people to the total number of black people rose from less than 1% to 10% in the Upper South. In Virginia, the proportion of free black people increased from 1% in 1782 to 7% in 1800. Together with several Northern states abolishing slavery during that period, the proportion of free black people nationally increased to ~14% of the total black population. New York and New Jersey adopted gradual abolition laws that kept the free children of slaves as indentured servants into their twenties.

After the 1793 invention of the cotton gin, which enabled the development of extensive new areas for cotton cultivation, the number of manumissions decreased because of increased demand for slave labour. In the 19th century, slave revolts such as the Haitian Revolution of 1791–1804, and especially the 1831 rebellion led by Nat Turner, increased slaveholders' fears. Most Southern states passed laws making manumission nearly impossible until the passage of the 1865 Thirteenth Amendment to the United States Constitution, which abolished slavery, except as a punishment for crime, after the American Civil War. In South Carolina, to free a slave required permission of the state legislature; Florida law prohibited manumission altogether.

== Ottoman Empire ==
Slavery in the Ottoman Empire gradually became less central to the functions of Ottoman society throughout the late 19th and early 20th centuries. Responding to the influence and pressure of European countries in the 19th century, the Ottoman Empire began taking steps to curtail the slave trade, which had been legally valid under Ottoman law since the beginning of the empire. A number of reforms where introduced; such as the firman of 1830, the firman of 1854 and the Kanunname of 1889.

Ottoman Empire policy encouraged manumission of male slaves, but not female slaves. The most telling evidence for this is found in the gender ratio; among slaves traded in Islamic empire across the centuries, there were roughly two females to every male.

Sexual slavery was a central part of the Ottoman slave system throughout the history of the institution, managed in accordance with the Islamic Law of concubinage, and the most resistant to change. Outside of explicit sexual slavery, most female slaves had domestic occupations, and often, this also included sexual relations with their masters. This was a lawful motive for their purchase, and the most common one. It was similarly a common motivation for their retention.

The Ottoman Empire and 16 other countries signed the 1890 Brussels Conference Act for the suppression of the slave trade. However, clandestine slavery persisted well into the 20th century. Gangs were also organized to facilitate the illegal importation of slaves. Slave raids and the taking of women and children as "spoils of war" lessened but did not stop entirely, despite the public denial of their existence, such as the enslavement of girls during the Armenian Genocide. Armenian girls were sold as slaves during the Armenian genocide of 1915. Turkey waited until 1933 to ratify the 1926 League of Nations convention on the suppression of slavery. However, illegal sales of girls were reported in the 1930s. Legislation explicitly prohibiting slavery was adopted in 1964.

== See also ==
- Emancipation
- Islamic views on slavery
- Mukataba
- Netto Question

== Sources ==
- Bradley, K.R. (1984). Slaves and masters in the Roman Empire
- Garlan, Y. (1988). Slavery in Ancient Greece. Ithaca. (trans. Janet Lloyd)
- Hopkins, M.K. (ed) (1978). Conquerors and Slaves
- Levy, Reuben (1957). The Social Structure of Islam. UK: Cambridge University Press. ISBN 9780521091824.
- Lewis, Bernard (1990). Race and Slavery in the Middle East. New York: Oxford University Press. ISBN 978-0-19-505326-5.
- Schimmel, A. (1992). Islam: An Introduction. US: SUNY Press. ISBN 978-0-7914-1327-2.
- Taylor, Alan (2013). The Internal Enemy: Slavery and War in Virginia, 1772–1832. New York: W.W. Norton & Company. ISBN 978-0393073713.
- Wilson, Theodore Brantner (1965). The Black Codes of the South. University of Alabama Press
