= Diocletian boundary stones =

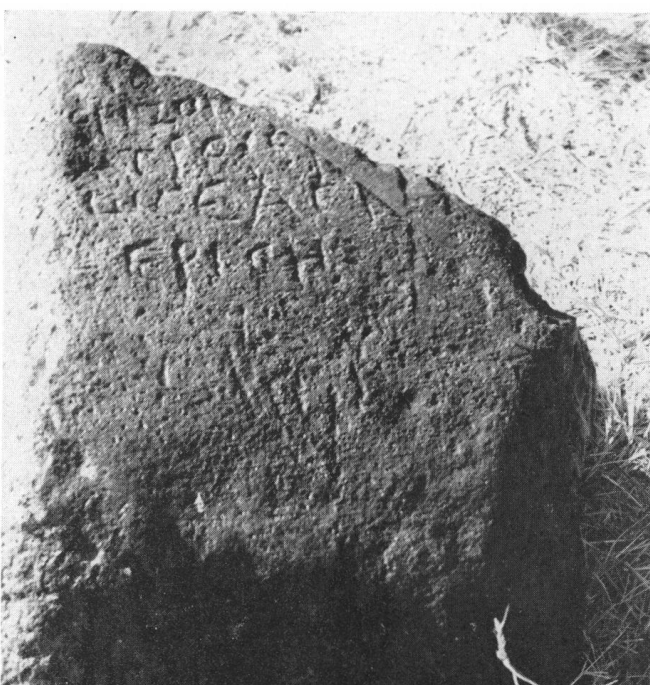
Diocletian boundary stone from the Hula Valley mentioning a village called Kaphar Migerame

Diocletian boundary stones are inscribed Roman markers erected in the late third and early fourth centuries CE, during the reign of Emperor Diocletian and his co-rulers of the Tetrarchy. Concentrated mainly in the northern Hula Valley, the Golan Heights, and the hinterland of Caesarea Philippi (Paneas), these stones demarcated agricultural land, village boundaries, and fiscal jurisdictions.

The Diocletian boundary stones are the only surviving monuments directly connected to Diocletian’s fiscal reforms in the Levant. With 46 known examples, this corpus is unique in the Roman world, as no other province preserves such extensive epigraphic evidence for the naming of villages, the demarcation of rural boundaries, and the implementation of imperial taxation reforms. Thus, they are among the most important sources for understanding Roman administration and the rural geography of the Near East. However, the majority of the place names recorded on these stones are now lost to history and cannot be identified with modern locations, which presents a significant challenge to researchers.

== Historical background ==
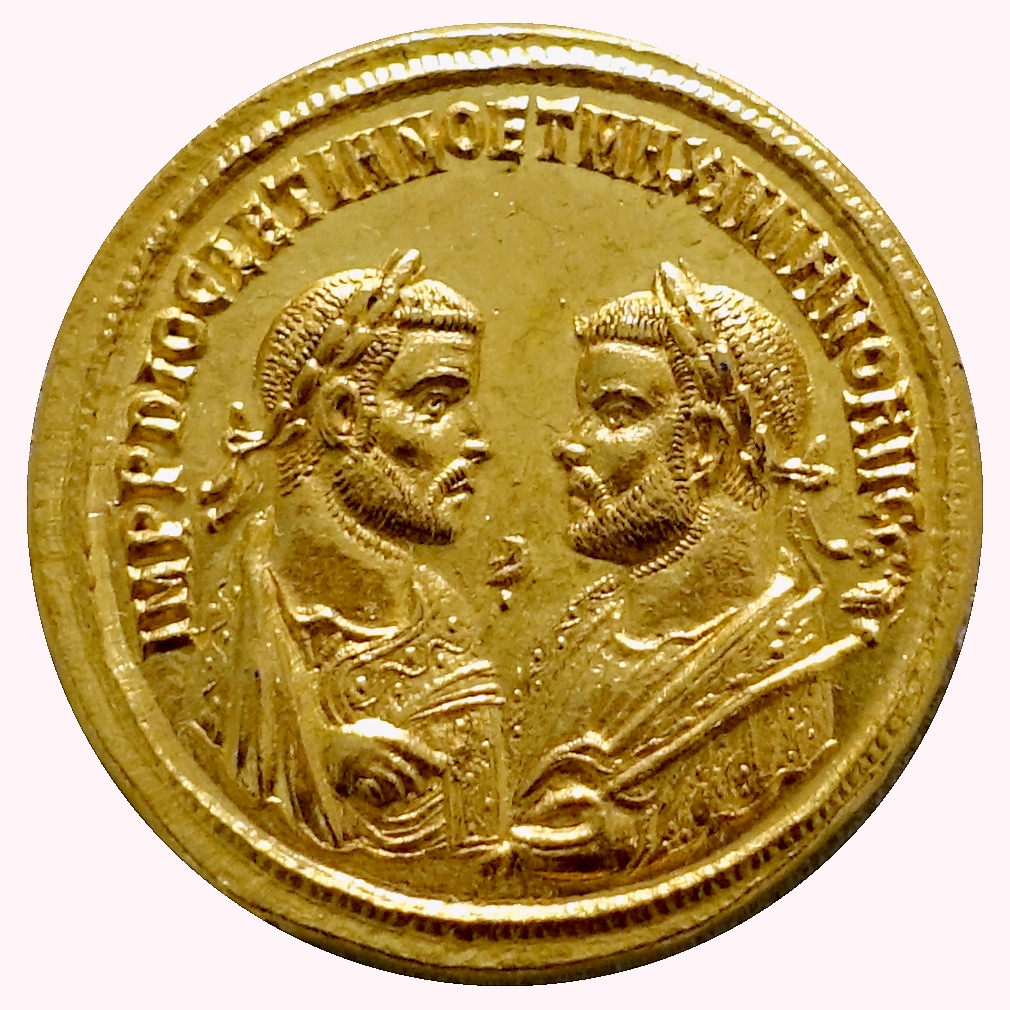
Diocletian and Maximian on a golden Aureus, during whose reign the boundary stones were erected

The stones are closely tied to Diocletian's administrative and fiscal reforms. Beginning in 293 CE, the empire reorganized taxation and land survey procedures to stabilize revenue and clarify village responsibilities. The inscriptions typically open with the names of the reigning emperors, followed by details of the lands being demarcated and the imperial officials who supervised the process.

== Archaeological discoveries ==
Over forty Diocletianic boundary stones are known from the Levant, with a striking concentration in the region around Paneas. They have been documented in the Golan, the Hula Valley, and adjacent territories, and are often found in secondary contexts, reused in later buildings or graves.

One well-preserved example was unearthed at Abel Beth Maacah in northern Galilee. Carved from basalt and about one meter high, the stone was found reused in a Mamluk-period grave. Its inscription, in Greek, names the four Tetrarchs and records the involvement of an imperial surveyor. It also preserves the names of two villages otherwise unknown in surviving sources: Tirthas and Golgol. Tirthas has been tentatively identified with Khirbet Turritha, a ruin on the western bank of the Hasbani River documented by the Survey of Western Palestine in the 1880s. Golgol is associated with the Semitic root GLGL ("to roll") and may be identified with a low, rounded hill marked on Survey of Western Palestine maps as Tell 'Ajul (Hebrew: Giv'at 'Egel). This toponymic shift is considered plausible, as the hill's oval shape is also reflected in the modern name.

== Importance ==
The Diocletianic boundary stones provide rare, direct archaeological evidence of how imperial reforms reshaped the countryside at the village level. The inscriptions show that the Roman state imposed clear boundaries on agricultural land for purposes of taxation and administration, reaching into even remote rural landscapes. They also preserve village names that would otherwise be lost, offering unique insights into the settlement patterns of the Late Roman Near East.

Because the stones preserve names of otherwise unattested villages, they function as a rare epigraphic map of rural landscapes otherwise invisible in written sources. Diocletianic boundary stones combine epigraphic, geographical, and social information in a single corpus. Few other regions of the Roman Empire preserve such direct testimony to the names of rural communities and the officials charged with overseeing them. As a result, the stones are frequently cited as a cornerstone for reconstructing the historical geography of late antique Palestine and Syria, offering a unique convergence of imperial policy and local rural life.

Scholars note that the Diocletianic boundary stones are unparalleled elsewhere in the Roman Empire. While milestones and dedicatory inscriptions are common, few regions preserve an epigraphic corpus of more than forty inscriptions of this sort This makes the Levantine stones a unique historical archive, one that not only illuminates imperial fiscal policy but also restores a rural landscape otherwise absent from literary sources. Their rarity has led historians to regard them as a key dataset for the study of provincial administration and the historical geography of late antiquity.

== Scholarly debates ==
Scholars continue to debate several aspects of the boundary stones. Questions remain about why they are so heavily concentrated in the northern Levant, how widespread such practices were elsewhere in the empire, and how rural communities responded to the new fiscal boundaries. Some ancient sources, such as the Jerusalem Talmud, have been interpreted as reflecting local resistance to Diocletian's policies. What is clear is that the stones offer unparalleled evidence for the interaction between imperial authority and local rural life.

A significant challenge for modern scholarship is that the majority of place names inscribed on the stones are unidentifiable today. This lack of identification limits the extent to which the stones can be used to reconstruct the precise administrative and geographical boundaries of the Roman provinces during Diocletian's reign.

== Media coverage ==
The discovery of the Abel Beth Maacah stone in 2025 received wide international press attention. The Guardian described it as "a remarkable window into Roman rural administration and forgotten village names," while Haaretz emphasized how the find "restores ancient geography long thought lost." Such reports highlight the wider cultural resonance of the stones as tangible links between ancient and modern landscapes.

== See also ==
- Roman taxation
- Caesarea Philippi
