= Capitatio-Iugatio =

Roman Empire tax collection system

The Capitatio-Iugatio is the tax collection system developed by Diocletian during the Roman Empire, which determines the amount levied on agriculturally productive land.

The tax reform was perhaps carried out as early as 287 and aimed to create a uniform system throughout the empire and to put the calculation of taxes on a more secure basis: The property tax, the Cura Annonae, was now based on the available labor and livestock (capita) as well as after the cultivated land (iugera) calculated by tax estimates (censitores). In this relatively complicated system, the assessment was based on the categories of people and animals (caput) and land (iugum) combined with each other (which mainly affected the rural population) and also subject Italy to direct taxation, which had not been the case before. Ideally, the tax estimate should take into account the individual performance of those affected and also allow regional differentiation, which did not always happen in practice. Nevertheless, some related complaints in the sources (e.g. already with Lactantius) are not to be seen as compelling evidence of an oppressive tax burden, but rather as subjective statements. The amount to be paid was initially determined every five years, then every 15 years since 312 (cf. Indication ) and fell within the remit of the Praetorian Prefect. Overall, the new tax system enabled steadily flowing income, especially for the eastern part of the empire.

It is sometimes assumed that this system was the model for a similar tax reform in the Sassanid Empire in the 6th century.

== Purpose ==
This system combined two pre-existing taxes, the iugatio (affecting land rents) and capitatio (affecting individuals). According to this methodology, the complex of arable land was divided into the various regions, according to the type of crop and their yield, into fiscal units called iuga, while the population was instead divided into fiscal units called capita. The value assigned to iuga and capita was not fixed, but varied according to the individual provinces and the needs of the state budget.

Precisely in order to rationalize the mass of taxes into an organic whole, Diocletian imposed the merger of all direct, land and personal taxes, into a single tax, precisely the capitatio-iugatio, levied on all the factors of production: men, beasts, lands, (or labor, capital, land) after having established the taxable amount on the basis of a gigantic land register of the wealth of the entire Empire.

However, the capitatio-iugatio ended up tying the peasant to the land, contributing to the training of serfs : in fact, just as a land without a peasant cannot be subject to tax, the same applies to a peasant without a land. Thus the Roman government bound a large mass of peasants to the land, while to tax those without land (traders, industrialists) Constantine I introduced a new tax, Collatio lustralis, particularly burdensome for those affected.

== Duration ==
The Roman tax system of the capitatio-iugatio survived until the end of the 7th century and then disappeared under the reign of Justinian II. It was a tax system that established in advance the amount of taxes to be paid in kind (but often paid in cash by membership), without taking into account famines, plagues, earthquakes, floods, devastation by the barbarians, or poor harvests. The authorities were willing to reduce the tax burden only in the event of very serious disasters, which could not go unnoticed. Sources attest that, in the event of years of bad harvests, citizens who could not raise the necessary taxes (usually in kind, except in special cases) often abandoned their possessions in desperation to escape the exactors.

Emperor Anastasius (491-518) reduced taxes and abolished the lustral tax but when Heraclius I (610-641) in 628 reconquered Syria and Egypt from the Persians, he was forced by debts contracted with the Church and empty state coffers, to unsustainably increase the tax burden in the newly recovered provinces, despite having been heavily devastated by the war against the Persians and therefore unable to provide good crops. The restored Byzantine rule in Syria and Egypt thus quickly became unpopular, not only because of the unsustainable tax burden, but also because of the persecution of the Monophysites and other religious minorities or heresies. The taxpayers of Syria and Egypt, unable to pay and aware that if they did not pay they would have to wait for confiscations and further harsh measures, preferred to submit to the Arab rule, where, even if forced to pay discriminatory taxes (Muslims were exempt), there were at least lower taxes than the imperial ones. Furthermore, the Arabs were more religiously tolerant of Christian sects than the Byzantines.

Justinian II separated the personal tax from that of the land, raising personal taxes (which affected everyone) and leading to an increase in free peasants.

== Bibliography ==
- Giorgio Ruffolo, Quando l'Italia era una superpotenza, Einaudi, 2004.
- Edward Luttwak (2009). The grand strategy of the Byzantine Empire. Milano: Rizzoli.
- Georg Ostrogorsky (1968). History of the Byzantine State. Torino: Einaudi.
- Walter A. Goffart (1974). Caput and Colonate. Towards a history of late Roman taxation. Toronto and Buffalo: Phoenix Supplementary Volume 12.
- U. Hildesheim (1988). Personalaspekte der frühbyzantinischen Steuerordnung. Die Personalveranlagung und ihre Einbindung in das System der capitatio - iugatio.
- Arnold Hugh Martin Jones (1964). The Later Roman Empire 284-602. A social, economic and administrative survey. 3 Bde. Oxford.
