= Plebeians =

General body of free Roman citizens

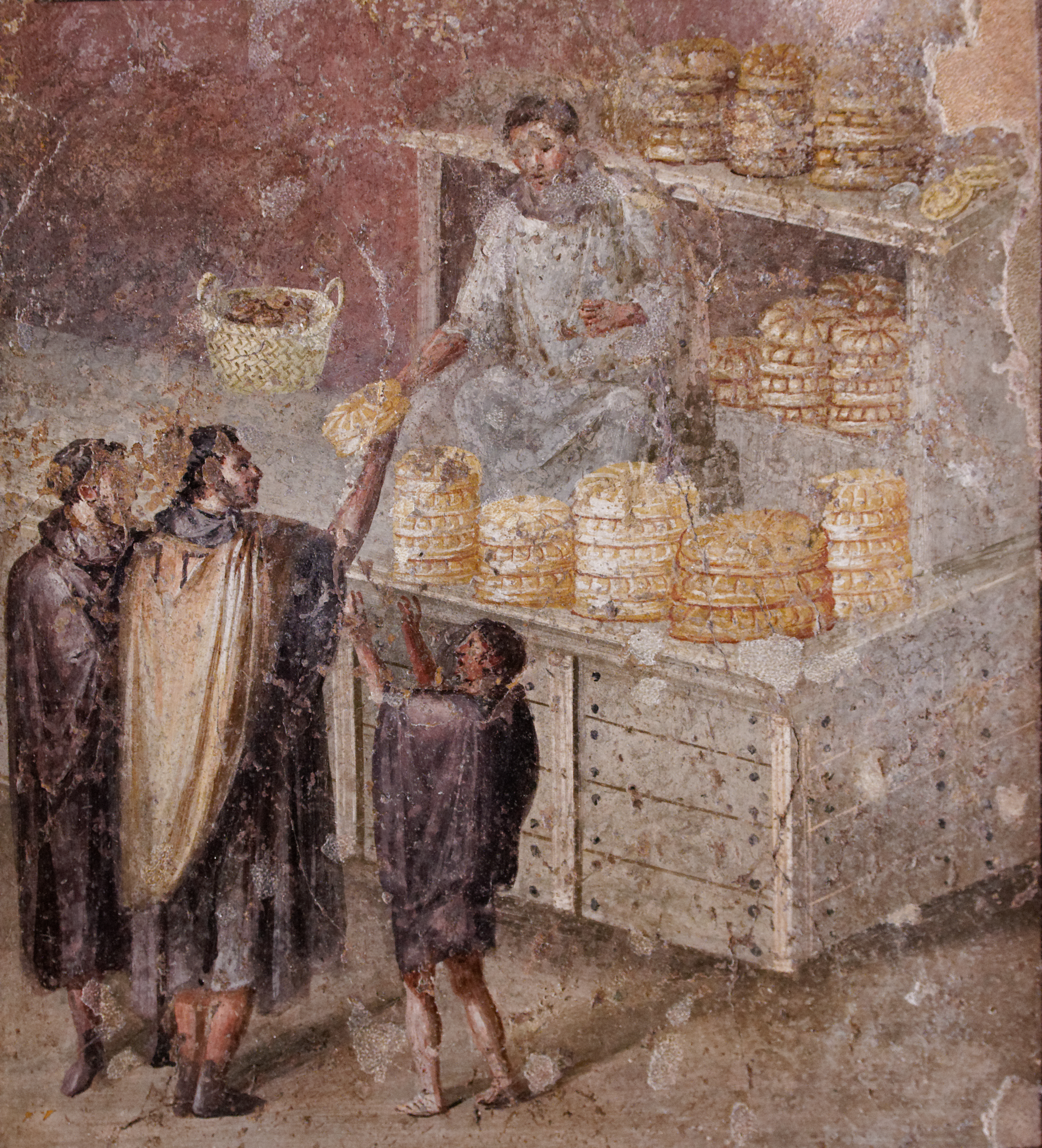
Distributing bread to plebeians

In ancient Rome, the plebs was the general body of free Roman citizens who were not patricians, as determined by the census, or were in other words "commoners". Both classes were hereditary. Members of the plebs were known as plebeians.

== Etymology ==
The precise origins of the group and the term are unclear, but may be related to the Greek plēthos, meaning masses.

In Latin, the word plebs is a singular collective noun, and its genitive is plebis. Plebeians were not a monolithic social class.

== In ancient Rome ==
In the annalistic tradition of Livy and Dionysius, the distinction between patricians and plebeians was as old as Rome itself, instituted by Romulus' appointment of the first hundred senators, whose descendants became the patriciate. Modern hypotheses date the distinction "anywhere from the regal period to the late fifth century" BC. The 19th-century historian Barthold Georg Niebuhr believed plebeians were possibly foreigners immigrating from other parts of Italy. This hypothesis, that plebeians were racially distinct from patricians, however, is not supported by the ancient evidence. Alternatively, the patriciate may have been defined by their monopolisation of hereditary priesthoods that granted ex officio membership in the senate. Patricians also may have emerged from a nucleus of the rich religious leaders who formed themselves into a closed elite after accomplishing the expulsion of the kings.

In the early Roman Republic, there are attested 43 clan names, of which 10 are plebeian with 17 of uncertain status.

There existed an aristocracy of wealthy families in the regal period, but "a clear-cut distinction of birth does not seem to have become important before the foundation of the Republic". The literary sources hold that in the early Republic, plebeians were excluded from magistracies, religious colleges, and the Senate. However, some scholars doubt that patricians monopolised the magistracies of the early republic, as plebeian names appear in the lists of Roman magistrates back to the fifth century BC. It is likely that patricians, over the course of the first half of the fifth century, were able to close off high political office from plebeians and exclude plebeians from permanent social integration through marriage.

Plebeians were enrolled into the curiae and the tribes; they also served in the army and also in army officer roles as tribuni militum.

=== Conflict of the Orders ===
The Conflict of the Orders (Latin: ordo meaning "social rank") refers to a struggle by plebeians for full political rights from the patricians. According to Roman tradition, shortly after the establishment of the Republic, plebeians objected to their exclusion from power and exploitation by the patricians. The plebeians were able to achieve their political goals by a series of secessions from the city: "a combination of mutiny and a strike".

Ancient Roman tradition claimed that the Conflict led to laws being published, written down, and given open access starting in 494 BC with the law of the Twelve Tables, which also introduced the concept of equality before the law, often referred to in Latin as libertas, which became foundational to republican politics. This succession also forced the creation of plebeian tribunes with authority to defend plebeian interests. Following this, there was a period of consular tribunes who shared power between plebeians and patricians in various years, but the consular tribunes apparently were not endowed with religious authority. In 445 BC, the lex Canuleia permitted intermarriage among plebeians and patricians.

There was a radical reform in 367–366 BC, which abolished consular tribunes and "laid the foundation for a system of government led by two consuls, shared between patricians and plebeians" over the religious objections of patricians, requiring at least one of the consuls to be a plebeian. And after 342 BC, plebeians regularly attained the consulship. Debt bondage was abolished in 326, freeing plebeians from the possibility of slavery by patrician creditors. By 287, with the passage of the lex Hortensia, plebiscites – or laws passed by the concilium plebis – were made binding on the whole Roman people. Moreover, it banned senatorial vetoes of plebeian council laws. And also around the year 300 BC, the priesthoods also were shared between patricians and plebeians, ending the "last significant barrier to plebeian emancipation".

The veracity of the traditional story is profoundly unclear: "many aspects of the story as it has come down to us must be wrong, heavily modernised ... or still much more myth than history". Substantial portions of the rhetoric put into the mouths of the plebeian reformers of the early Republic are likely imaginative reconstructions, reflecting the late republican politics of their writers. Contradicting claims that plebeians were excluded from politics from the fall of the monarchy, they appear in the consular lists during the early 5th century BC. The form of the state may also have been substantially different, with a temporary ad hoc "senate", not taking on fully classical elements for more than a century from the republic's establishment.

=== Noble plebeians ===
The completion of plebeian political emancipation was founded on a republican ideal dominated by nobiles, who were defined not by caste or heredity, but by their accession to the high offices of state, elected from both patrician and plebeian families. There was substantial convergence in this class of people, with a complex culture of preserving the memory of and celebrating one's political accomplishments and those of one's ancestors. This culture also focused considerably on achievements in terms of war and personal merit.

Throughout the Second Samnite War (326–304 BC), plebeians who had risen to power through these social reforms began to acquire the aura of nobilitas ("nobility", also "fame, renown"), marking the creation of a ruling elite of nobiles. From the mid-4th century to the early 3rd century BC, several plebeian–patrician "tickets" for the consulship repeated joint terms, suggesting a deliberate political strategy of cooperation.

No contemporary definition of nobilis or novus homo (a person entering the nobility) exists; Mommsen, positively referenced by Brunt (1982), said the nobiles were patricians, patrician whose families had become plebeian (in a conjectural transitio ad plebem), and plebeians who had held curule offices (e.g., dictator, consul, praetor, and curule aedile). Becoming a senator after election to a quaestorship did not make a man a nobilis, only those who were entitled to a curule seat were nobiles. However, by the time of Cicero in the post-Sullan Republic, the definition of nobilis had shifted. Now, nobilis came to refer only to former consuls and the direct relatives and male descendants thereof. The new focus on the consulship "can be directly related to the many other displays of pedigree and family heritage that became increasingly common after Sulla" and with the expanded senate and number of praetors diluting the honour of the lower offices.

A person becoming nobilis by election to the consulate was a novus homo (a new man). Marius and Cicero are notable examples of novi homines (new men) in the late Republic, when many of Rome's richest and most powerful men – such as Lucullus, Marcus Crassus, and Pompey – were plebeian nobles.

=== Later history ===
In the later Republic, the term lost its indication of a social order or formal hereditary class, becoming used instead to refer to citizens of lower socio-economic status. By the early empire, the word was used to refer to people who were not senators (of the empire or of the local municipalities) or equestrians.

== Life ==
Plebeians typically lived in small, crowded homes without running water or private toilets. Waste was thrown into the street through windows, and many houses had no kitchens, so plebeians would often eat at local bars. They were ineligible for jobs available to patricians and often held jobs such as bakers, builders, or artisans. Richer plebeians (equestrians) could live like patricians, with slaves and larger homes, though social barriers persisted. They had a simple diet consisting of staples such as bread, porridge, beans, olives, and occasionally meat.

=== Childhood and education ===
The average plebeian did not come into a wealthy family; the politically active nobiles as a whole comprised a very small portion of the whole population. The average plebeian child was expected to enter the workforce at a young age.

Education was limited to what their parent would teach them, which consisted of only learning the very basics of writing, reading and mathematics. Wealthier plebeians were able to send their children to schools or hire a private tutor.

=== Family life ===
Throughout Roman society at all levels including plebeians, the paterfamilias (oldest male in the family) held ultimate authority over household manners. Sons could have no authority over fathers at any point in their life. Women had a subservient position in the family to fathers and husbands.

=== Living quarters ===
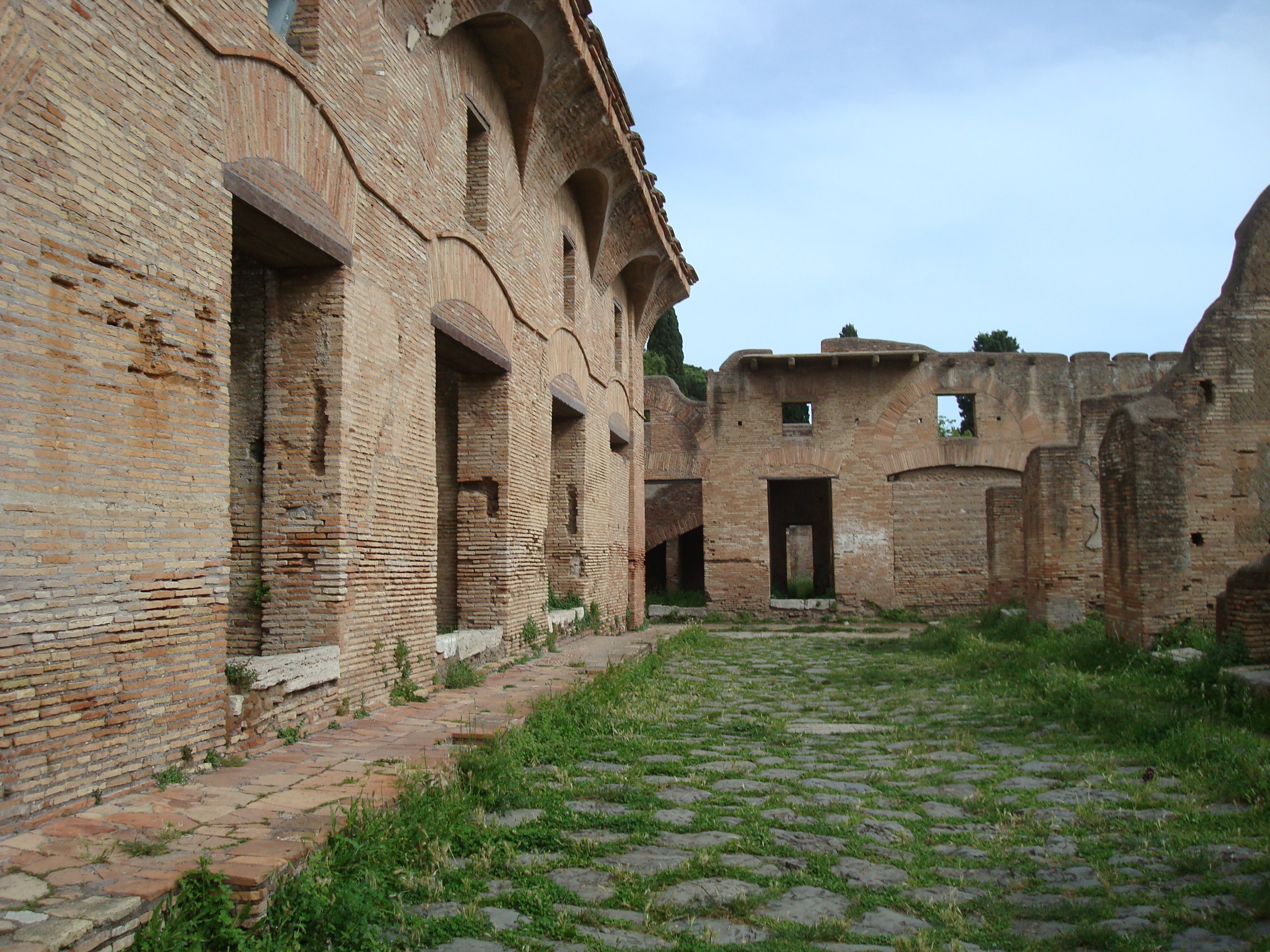
Ruins of insulae

Plebeians who lived in the cities were referred to as plebs urbana.

Plebeians in ancient Rome lived in three or four-storey buildings called insula, apartment buildings that housed many families. These apartments usually lacked running water and heat. These buildings had no bathrooms and was common for a pot to be used. The quality of these buildings varied. Accessing upper floors was done via a staircase from the street they were built on. Sometimes these were built around a courtyard and of these, some were built around a courtyard containing a cistern. Lower floors were of higher quality while the higher ones were less so. By the beginning of the Roman Empire, the insulae were deemed to be so dangerous because of a risk to collapse that Emperor Augustus passed a law limiting the height of the buildings to 18 metres (59 ft) but it appeared this law was not closely followed as buildings appeared that were six or seven floors high. Plebeian apartments had frescoes and mosaics on them to serve as decorations. Rents for housing in cities was often high because of the amount of demand and simultaneously low supply. Rents were higher in Rome than other cities in Italy along with other provincial cities. The owner of the insulae did not attend to duties regarding it and instead used an insularius who was most often an educated slave or a freedman instead. Their job was to collect rent from tenants, manage disputes between individual tenants and be responsible for maintenance.

Not all plebeians lived in these conditions. Some wealthier plebeians were able to live in single-family homes, called domus.

=== Attire ===
Plebeian men wore a tunic, generally made of wool or inexpensive material, with a belt at the waist, as well as sandals. Meanwhile, women wore a long dress called a stola. Roman fashion trends changed very little over the course of many centuries. However, hairstyles and facial hair patterns changed as initially early plebeian men had beards before a clean shaven look became more popular during the Republican era before having facial hair was popularized again by Emperor Hadrian in the 2nd century AD. Some plebeian women would wear cosmetics made from charcoal and chalk. Romans generally wore clothes with bright colors and did wear a variety of jewelry.

=== Meals ===
Since meat was very expensive, animal products such as pork, beef and veal would have been considered a delicacy to plebeians. Instead, a plebeian diet mainly consisted of bread and vegetables. Common flavouring for their food included honey, vinegar and different herbs and spices. A well-known condiment to this day known as garum, which is a fish sauce, was also largely consumed. Apartments often did not have kitchens in them so families would get food from restaurants and/or bars.

=== Recreation and entertainment ===
One popular outlet of entertainment for Roman plebeians was to attend large entertainment events such as gladiator matches, military parades, religious festivals and chariot races. As time went on, politicians increased the number of games in an attempt to win over votes and make the plebeians happy. A popular dice game among plebeians was called alea.

=== Financial status ===
Plebeians who resided in urban areas had to often deal with job insecurity, low pay, unemployment and high prices along with underemployment. A standard workday lasted for 6 hours although the length of the hours varied as Romans divided the day into 12 daytime hours and 12 nighttime hours; with the hours being determined based on the seasons. Cicero wrote in the late republican period that he estimated the average laborer working in the city of Rome earned 6 1/2 denarii a day which was 5 times what a provincial worker would make. By the middle of the 1st century AD this number was higher because of inflation, but the high cost of living in the city of Rome kept the value of real wages down.

Some plebeians would sell themselves into slavery or their children in order to have access to wealthy households and to them hopefully advance socially along with getting a chance to have an education. Another way plebeians would try to advance themselves was by joining the military which became easier after the Marian reforms as soldiers were expected to pay for their own weapons. By joining the military they could get a fixed salary, share of war loot along with a pension and an allotted land parcel. There was also the reward of getting citizenship for non-citizens. Potential recruits needed to meet a variety of requirements as well which included: being male, at least 172 centimetres (5 ft 8 in) tall, enlist before one was 35, having a letter of recommendation and completing training.

== Derivatives ==
=== United States military academies ===
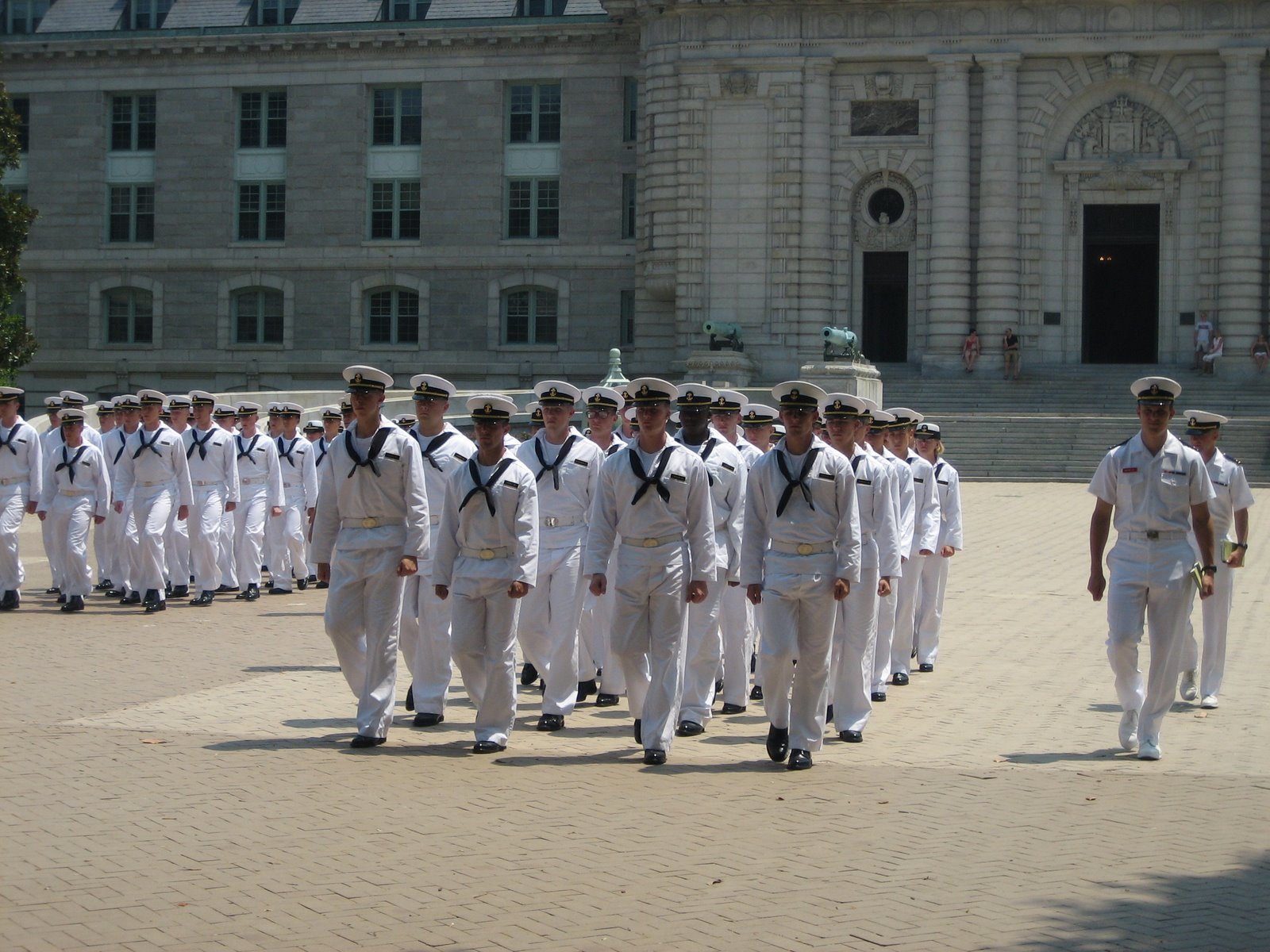
Plebes (first-year students) marching in front of Bancroft Hall, United States Naval Academy

In the U.S. military, plebes are freshmen at the U.S. Military Academy, U.S. Naval Academy, Valley Forge Military Academy and College, the Marine Military Academy, the U.S. Merchant Marine Academy, Georgia Military College (only for the first quarter), and California Maritime Academy.

=== Philippine Military Academy ===
Since the construction of Philippine Military Academy, the system and traditions were programmed the same as the United States Military Academy. First Year Cadets in PMA are called Plebes or Plebos (short term for Fourth Class Cadets) because they are still civilian antiques and they are expected to master first the spirit of Followership. As plebes, they are also expected to become the "working force (force men or "porsmen") in the Corps of Cadets.

=== British and Commonwealth usage ===
In British, Irish, Australian, New Zealand and South African English, the back-formation pleb, along with the more recently derived adjectival form plebby, is used as a derogatory term for someone considered unsophisticated, uncultured, or lower class.

== In popular culture ==
The British comedy show Plebs followed plebeians during ancient Rome.

In Margaret Atwood's novel Oryx and Crake, there is a major class divide. The rich and educated live in safeguarded facilities while others live in dilapidated cities referred to as the "pleeblands".

== See also ==
- Bread and circuses – Figure of speech referring to a superficial means of appeasement
- Capite censi – Lowest class of citizens of ancient Rome
- Plebeian Council – Principal assembly of the Roman Republic
- Proletariat – Class of wage-earners
- Plebgate (aka Plodgate or Gategate), a 2012 British political scandal involving the use of the word as a slur
