= Adsidui =

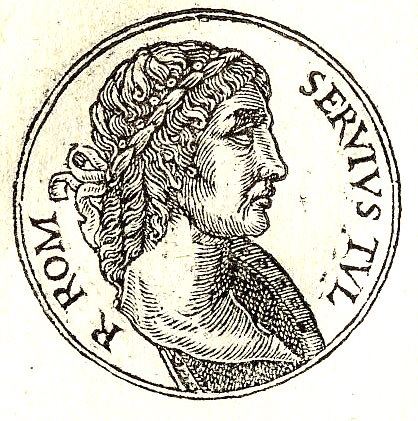
Servius Tullius

In ancient Rome, adsidui (sg. adsiduus; also assiduus, assidui, Latin for "diligent, loyal", and collectively, "taxpayers") were the citizens who were liable to military service in the main line of battle, that is, for much of the history of the Roman Republic, as legionaries. The adsidui were the members of the first five census classes, which were, according to the Roman historian Livy, created under the reign of Servius Tullius, the sixth legendary king of ancient Rome. Under Tullius' original organisation, the first class was made of the richest, and thus best-equipped citizens, with helmet, shield, greaves, cuirass, spear and sword. As one went down through the classes and the corresponding levels of wealth, equipment went lighter and lighter. According to Peter Connolly, the goal of Tullius' reform was to base military service on wealth, and not race, thus better integrating the Etruscans, who at that time ruled Rome and the Romans themselves; he points out, however, that in the beginning most members of the richest first class must have been Etruscans.

The adsidui were, as opposed to the proletarii, eligible to serve in the legions. In 107 BC, Gaius Marius enrolled the landless capite censi in his army, a one-off occurrence, as in the following Cimbric War, Marius returned to conscripting from the adsidui.
