= Tributum soli =

Ancient Roman tax on land

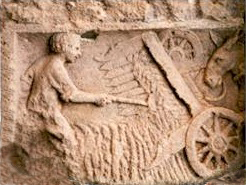
Ancient Roman farmer, the Tributum Soli was an agricultural tax

The Tributum soli was a direct ancient Roman tax on agricultural land and possibly the equipment used to cultivate the land. The size of tax was determined based on the size and quality of the land, and the land was assessed using a census. Greek cities during the Roman Empire would appoint magistrates, usually called dekaprotoi. During the Roman Empire the Tributum soli was split into two taxes, the stipendium and the Tributum soli. The difference between the two was that the stipendium was used in senatorial provinces, while the Tributum was used in imperial provinces. In some areas it was a fixed sum paid in currency. It was paid in kind and collected by the publicani in other provinces.
