= Vicesima libertatis =

Ancient Roman tax on freed slaves

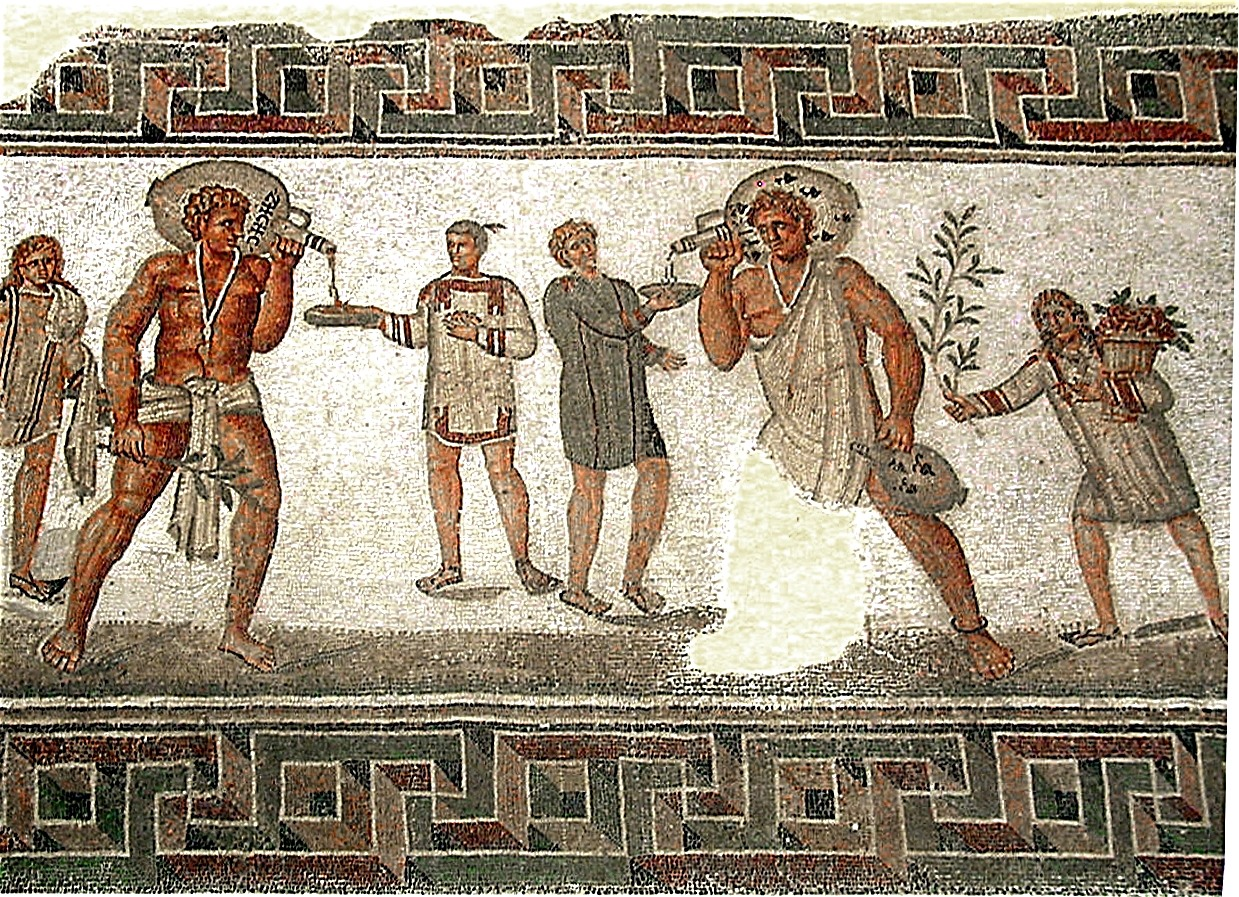
Ancient Roman slaves

The Vicesima libertatis, also known as the Vicesima Manumissionum, was an ancient Republican Roman tax on freed slaves. It is unclear how the tax was collected. One possibility is that, if the master freed the slave, the government would tax the master for 5% of the slave's value, while if the slaves freed themselves then the tax would be levied on them. Another possibility is that the tax was placed on registering a slave as free, rather than for freeing them in the first place. Evidence dating back to the Republic suggests that the collection of the tax was likely farmed out to the publicani. By the time of the empire, collection of the tax likely was controlled by the emperor themselves.

According to Livy, it was established in 357 BCE by the Consul Gnaeus Manlius. It is possible that this tax was instituted to compensate for the deprivation of the Roman treasury, known as the aerarium Saturni. Livy stated that the wealth collected from the tax, which totaled around four thousand pounds of gold, was retained to be used exclusively in the event of an emergency. The senate gave permission for the consuls of 209 BCE to use the funds to aid the war effort against Hannibal. Cassius Dio wrote that Caracalla increased the rate of the tax to 10%, and then Emperor Macrinus quickly restored it to its original level. There are no later references to the Vicesima libertatis in ancient Roman literature. This indicates that the tax survived until the time of Constantine and Diocletian, and was removed by reforms introduced by these emperors. There is no archaeological evidence for this tax in all provinces except for Italy before the Severan dynasty.
