= Aes equestre =

Allotment of money used during the Roman Republic to provide each cavalrymen with a horse

The aes equestre was an allotment paid during the Roman Republic to each cavalryman to provide him with a horse. This was said to have been instituted by Servius Tullius as part of his reorganization of the military. This allotment was 10,000 asses, to be given to the Equus publicus out of the public treasury (ex publico) of Rome. A similar allotment, the aes hordearium paid for the horses' upkeep, and was funded by a tax of 2,000 ases annually on unmarried women and orphans possessing a certain amount of property

Some say the equites had a right to distrain for this money likewise, it seems impossible that this account can be correct; for we can hardly conceive that a private person had a right of distress against a magistrate, that is, against the state, or that he could distrain any of the public property of the state. It is more probable that, since this money was paid by the single women and orphans, that it was against these that the equites had the same right to distrain, as they had in the case of the aes hordearium.

== Attribution ==
This article incorporates text from a free content work. Licensed under Public Domain (license statement/permission). Text taken from Aes Equestre, William Smith, D.C.L., LL.D.:, Bill Thayer. A Dictionary of Greek and Roman Antiquities, John Murray, London, 1875..
