= Lost toponym =

Geographic terminology

A lost toponym is a name given to a place which is no longer known or identifiable.

For example, in 1618 the crew of the Mauritius explored a river in north-western Australia, which they named Willems Revier ("Willem's River"). However it is not now known which river they explored, so Willems River cannot be placed on a present-day map. Willems River is therefore a lost toponym.
