= Equus publicus =

The equus publicus (literally "horse bought by the commonwealth") was an honourable status in ancient Rome, granting its holder a military horse paid for by the state, along with the cost of its fodder for its whole life. The money for the horse was called aes equestre, whilst the annual money for the horse's provisions for a year was called aes hordearium.

== History ==
Equus publicus was originally given to all members of the equites class, which was drawn from the patricians, in the regnal period. During the republican period, while the status of equites was obtainable by way of having a property value of more than 100,000 denarii or else inheritance, but the equus publicus was only attainable by way of inheritance from a father. In imperial times, after the reforms of Augustus, the status could be granted by an emperor, along with inheritance from a father.

== See also ==
- Social class in ancient Rome
