= Proletariat =

Class of wage-earners

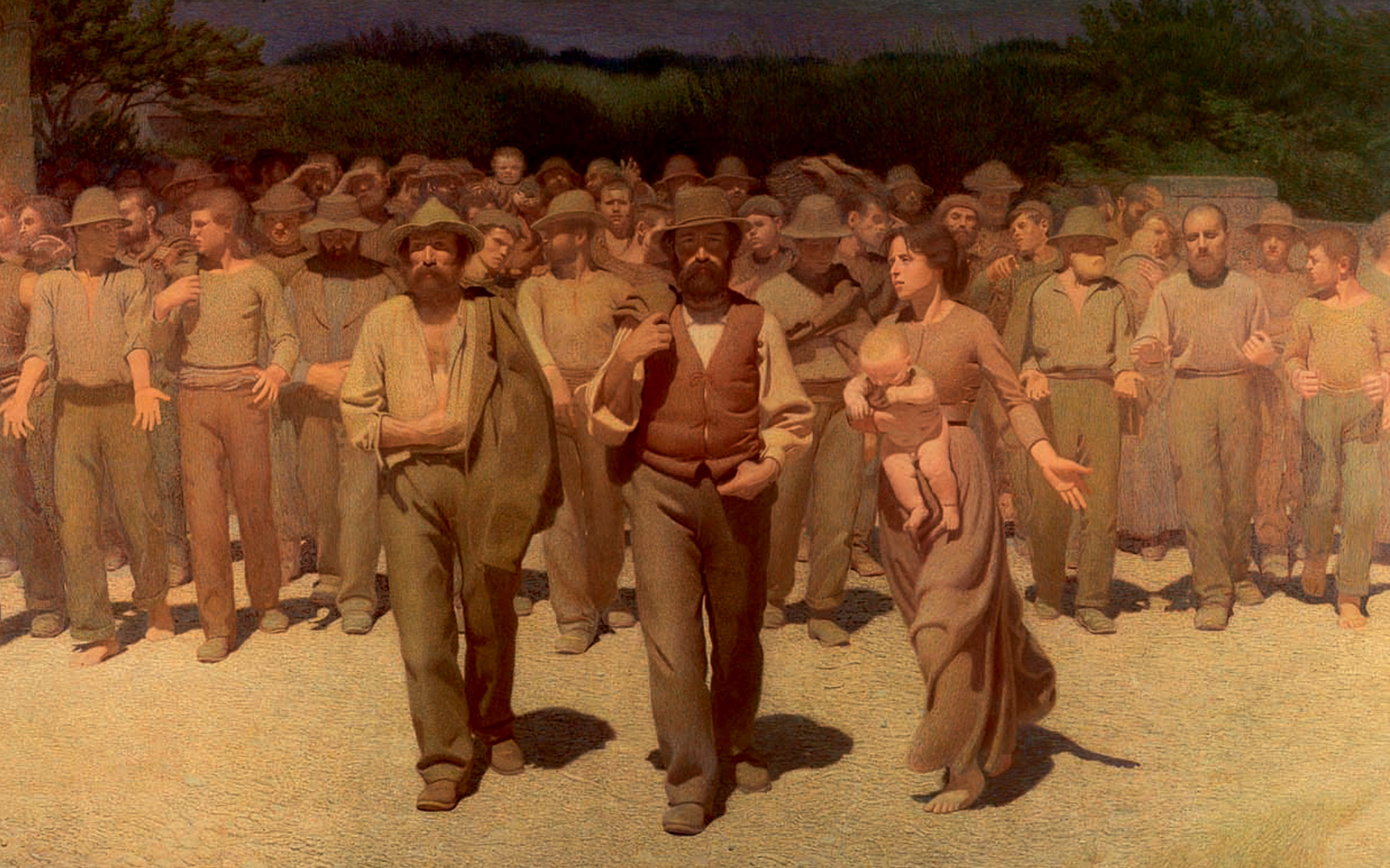
The Fourth Estate (1901) by Giuseppe Pellizza da Volpedo

The proletariat (/ˌproʊlɪˈtɛəriət/; from Latin proletarius 'producing offspring') is the socioeconomic class of wage laborers, members of a capitalist society whose most significant economic value is their labour power (their capacity to work). A member of such a class is a proletarian or a worker. Marxist philosophy regards the proletariat under conditions of capitalism as an exploited class, deprived of the means of production and thereby forced to operate means of production held as private property by the capitalist class (the bourgeoisie), receiving wages which represent less than the value their labour produced, the remainder appropriated by the bourgeoisie as profits.

Karl Marx argued that the inherently irreconcilable interests between workers and capitalists gives the workers common economic and political interests that transcend national boundaries, impelling them to unite internationally and assert their sovereignty over the capitalist class, and eventually to create a communist society free from class distinctions.

== Roman Republic and Empire ==
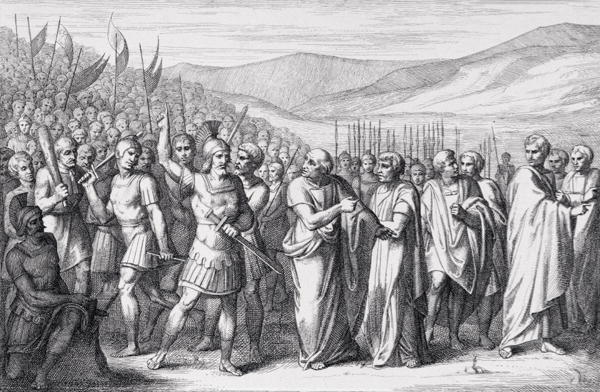
Secessio plebis, a form of protest in ancient Rome where the plebeians would leave the city, causing the economy to collapse

The proletarii constituted a social class of Roman citizens who owned little or no property. The name presumably originated with the census, which Roman authorities conducted every five years to produce a register of citizens and their property, which determined their military duties and voting privileges. Those who owned 11,000 assēs (coins) or fewer fell below the lowest category for military service, and their children—prōlēs (offspring)—were listed instead of property; hence the name proletarius (producer of offspring). Roman citizen-soldiers paid for their own horses and arms, and fought without payment for the commonwealth, but the only military contribution of a proletarius was his children, the future Roman citizens who could colonize conquered territories. Officially, propertyless citizens were called capite censi because they were "persons registered not as to their property...but simply as to their existence as living individuals, primarily as heads (caput) of a family." (Note: Arnold J. Toynbee, especially in his A Study of History, uses the word "proletariat" in this general sense of people without property or a stake in society. Toynbee focuses particularly on the generative spiritual life of the "internal proletariat" (those living within a given civil society). He also describes the "heroic" folk legends of the "external proletariat" (poorer groups living outside the borders of a civilization). Compare Toynbee, A Study of History (Oxford University 1934–1961), 12 volumes, in Volume V Disintegration of Civilizations, part one (1939) at 58–194 (internal proletariat), and at 194–337 (external proletariat).)

Although explicitly included by name in the Comitia Centuriata (Centuriate Assembly), proletarii were the lowest class, largely deprived of voting rights. Not only did proletarii have less voting "weight" in the various elections, but since voting ran hierarchically starting with the highest social ranks, a majority could be reached early and their votes never even taken. Late Roman historians such as Livy vaguely described the Comitia Centuriata as a popular assembly of early Rome composed of centuriae, voting units representing classes of citizens according to wealth. This assembly, which usually met on the Campus Martius to discuss public policy, designated the military duties of Roman citizens. One of the reconstructions of the Comitia Centuriata features 18 centuriae of cavalry, and 170 centuriae of infantry divided into five classes by wealth, plus 5 centuriae of support personnel called adsidui, one of which represented the proletarii. In battle, the cavalry brought their horses and arms, the top infantry class full arms and armour, the next two classes less, the fourth class only spears, the fifth slings, while the assisting adsidui held no weapons. If unanimous, the cavalry and top infantry class were enough to decide an issue. A deeper reconstruction incorporating social backgrounds found that the senators, the knights, and the first class held 88 out of 193 centuriae, the two lowest propertied classes held only 30 centuriae, but the proletarii held only 1. Musicians, by way of comparison, had more voting power despite far fewer citizens, with 2 centuriae. "[F]or the voting to reach the proletarii a very profound split in the elite and the higher classes was required."

== Modern use ==
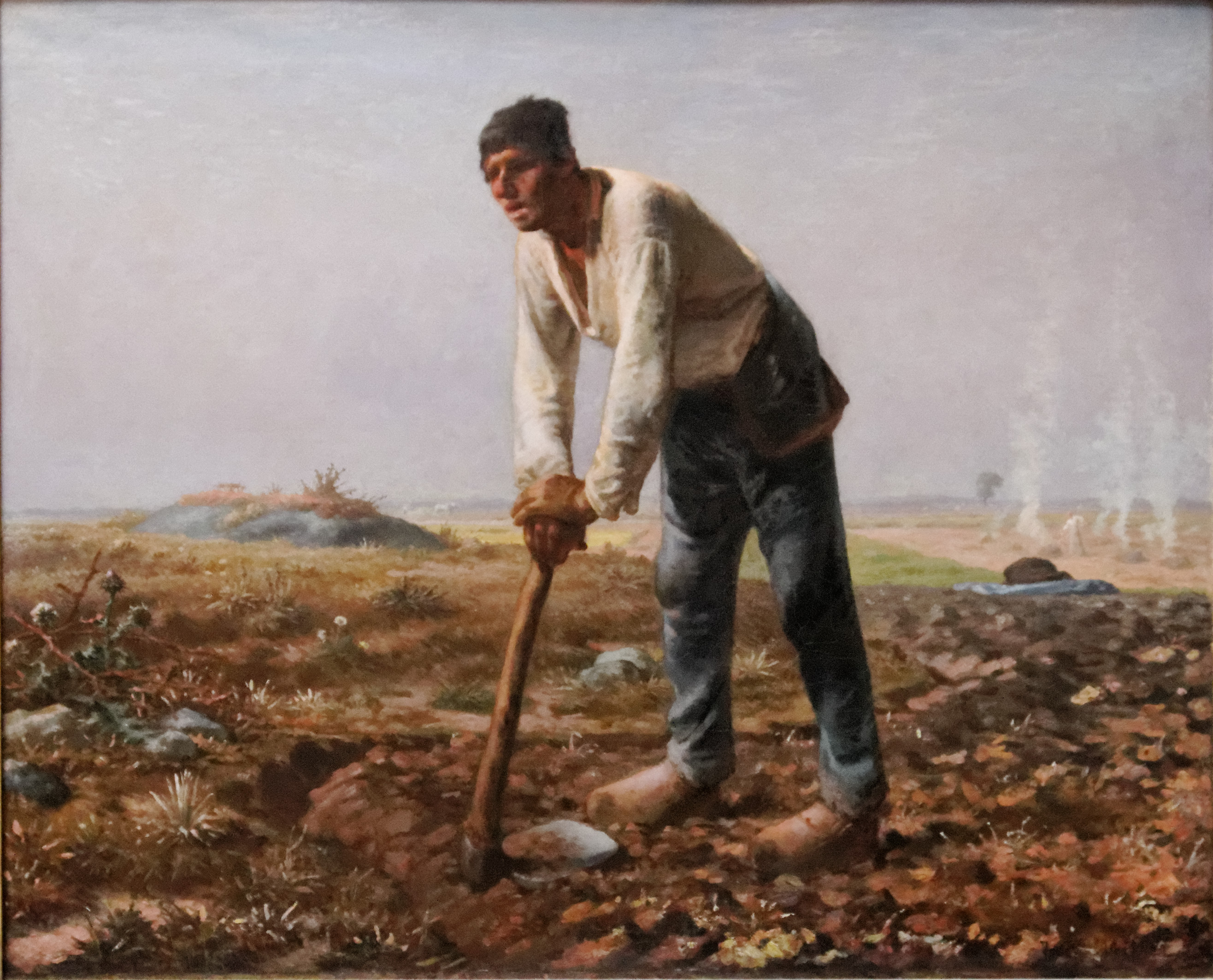
Jean-François Millet – The man with the hoe, c.1861

=== Classic liberal view ===
In the early 19th century, many Western European liberal scholars—who dealt with social sciences and economics—pointed out the socio-economic similarities of the modern rapidly growing industrial worker class and the classic proletarians. One of the earliest analogies comparing workers to the "slaves" of the Roman period can be found in the 1839 work by French philosopher and political scientist Felicité Robert de Lamennais, De l'esclavage moderne. It was translated to English and published the following year with the title "Modern Slavery". He wrote, "The proletarian is one who lives by his labor, and who could not live unless he did labor. [...] The necessity of living makes the laborer dependent upon the capitalist, irremediably his subject: because in the purse of the one is the other’s life."

Swiss liberal economist and historian Jean Charles Léonard de Sismondi was the first to apply the proletariat term to the working class created under capitalism, and whose writings were frequently cited by Karl Marx. Marx most likely encountered the term while studying the works of Sismondi.

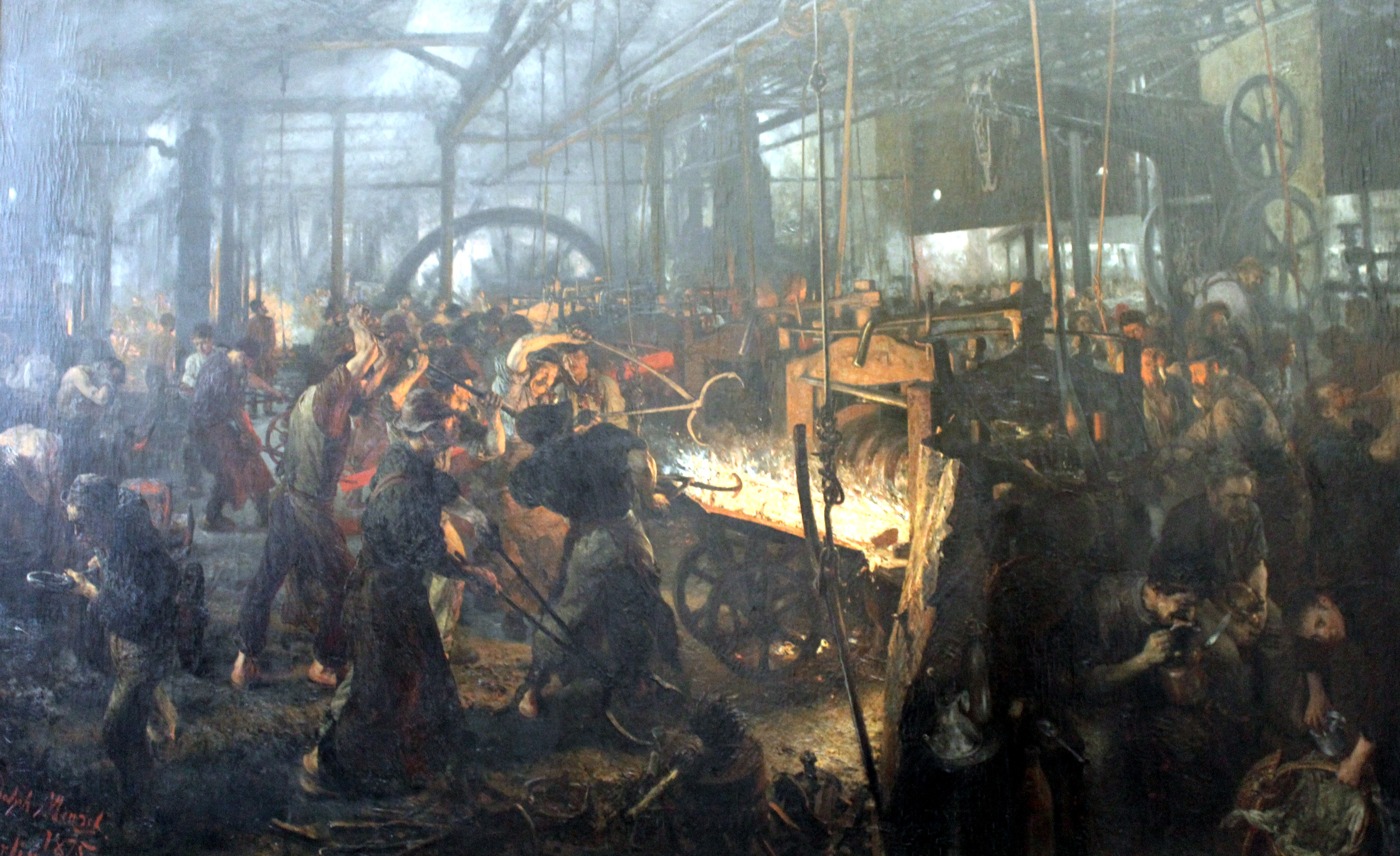
Adolph Menzel – Iron rolling mill (1872–1875)

=== Marxist theory ===
Marx, who studied Roman law at the Friedrich Wilhelm University of Berlin, used the term proletariat in his socio-political theory (Marxism) to describe a working class untainted by private property and capable of revolutionary action to topple capitalism and abolish social classes, leading society to ever higher levels of prosperity and justice. With reference to such expectations, Andreas Dorschel, alluding to Sigmund Freud's notion of "super-ego" ("Über-Ich"), calls Marx's proletariat a "super-we" ("Über-Wir") installed above any actual workers' movement.

Marx himself defined the proletariat as the social class having no significant ownership of the means of production (factories, machines, land, mines, buildings, vehicles) and whose only means of subsistence is to sell their labour power for a wage or salary. Borders between the proletariat and adjacent social classes have been defined only vaguely in Marxist theory. In the socially superior, less progressive direction are the lower petty bourgeoisie, such as small shopkeepers, who rely primarily on self-employment at an income comparable to an ordinary wage. Intermediate positions are possible, where wage-labor for an employer combines with self-employment. In another direction, the lumpenproletariat or "rag-proletariat", which Marx considers a retrograde class, live in the informal economy outside of legal employment: the poorest outcasts of society such as beggars, tricksters, entertainers, buskers, criminals and prostitutes. Socialist parties have often argued over whether they should organize and represent all the lower classes, or only the wage-earning proletariat.

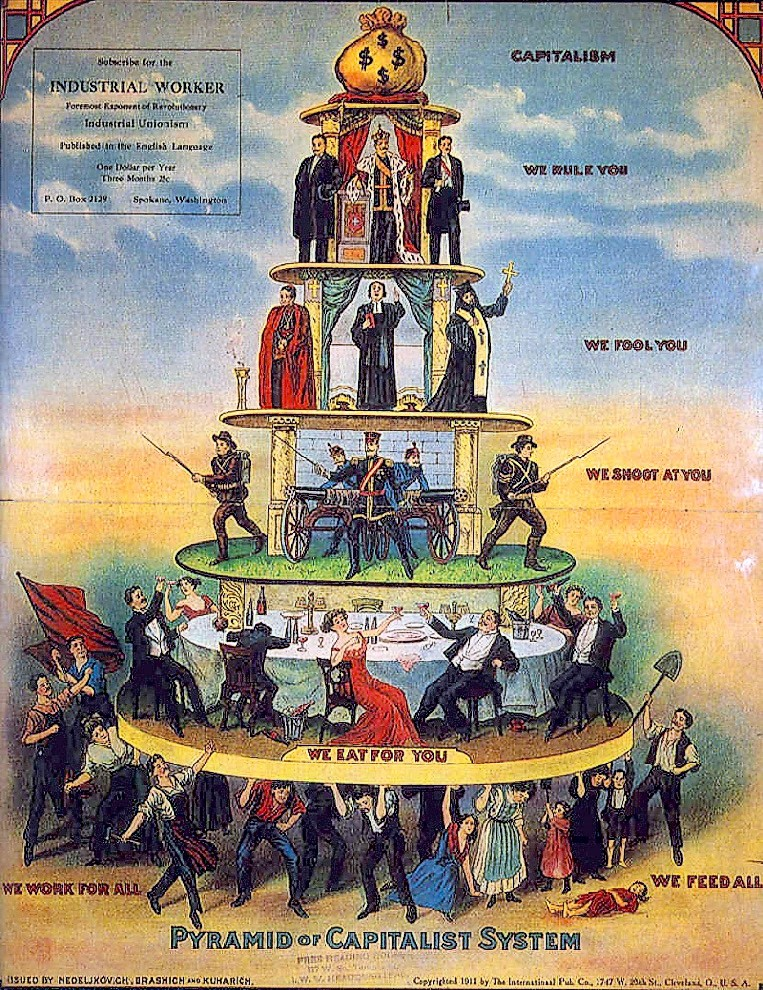
A 1911 Industrial Worker publication advocating industrial unionism based on a critique of capitalism. The proletariat "work for all" and "feed all".

According to Marxism, capitalism is based on the exploitation of the proletariat by the bourgeoisie: the workers, who own no means of production, must use the property of others to produce goods and services and to earn their living. Workers cannot rent the means of production (e.g. a factory or department store) to produce on their own account; rather, capitalists hire workers, and the goods or services produced become the property of the capitalist, who sells them at the market.

Part of the net selling price pays the workers' wages (variable costs); a second part renews the means of production (constant costs, capital investment); while the third part is consumed by the capitalist class, split between the capitalist's personal profit and fees to other owners (rents, taxes, interest on loans, etc.). The struggle over the first part (wage rates) puts the proletariat and bourgeoisie into irreconcilable conflict, as market competition pushes wages inexorably to the minimum necessary for the workers to survive and continue working. The second part, called capitalized surplus value, is used to renew or increase the means of production (capital), either in quantity or quality. The second and third parts are known as surplus value, the difference between the wealth the proletariat produce and the wealth they consume.

Marxists argue that new wealth is created through labor applied to natural resources. The commodities that proletarians produce and capitalists sell are valued not for their usefulness, but for the amount of labour embodied in them: for example, air is essential but requires no labor to produce, and is therefore free; while a diamond is much less useful, but requires hundreds of hours of mining and cutting, and is therefore expensive. The same goes for the workers' labor power: it is valued not for the amount of wealth it produces, but for the amount of labor necessary to keep the workers fed, housed, sufficiently trained, and able to raise children as new workers. On the other hand, capitalists earn their wealth not as a function of their personal labor, which may even be null, but by the juridical relation of their property to the means of production (e.g. owning a factory or farmland).

Marx argues that history is made by man and not destiny. The instruments of production and the working class that use the tools in order to produce are referred to as the moving forces of society. Over time, this developed into the levels of social class where the owners of resources joined to squeeze productivity out of the individuals who depended on their labor power. Marx argues that these relations between the exploiters and exploited results in different modes of production and the successive stages in history. These modes of production in which mankind gains power over nature is distinguished into five different systems: the Primitive Community, Slave State, Feudal State, Capitalist System, and finally the Socialist Society. The transition between these systems were all due to an increase in civil unrest among those who felt oppressed by a higher social class.

The contention with feudalism began once the merchants and guild artisans grew in numbers and power. Once they organized themselves, they began opposing the fees imposed on them by the nobles and clergy. This development led to new ideas and eventually established the Bourgeoisie class which Marx opposes. Commerce began to change the form of production and markets began to shift in order to support larger production and profits. This change led to a series of revolutions by the bourgeois which resulted in capitalism. Marx argues that this same model can and should be applied to the fight for the proletariat. Forming unions similar to how the merchants and artisans did will establish enough power to enact change. Ultimately, Marx's theory of the proletarian's struggle would eventually lead to the fall of capitalism and the emergence of a new mode of production, socialism.

Marx argued that the proletariat would inevitably displace the capitalist system with the dictatorship of the proletariat, abolishing the social relationships underpinning the class system and then developing into a communist society in which "the free development of each is the condition for the free development of all".

During the Chinese Communist Revolution, the concept of the proletariat emphasized having a proletarian class consciousness, rather than having proletarian social attributes (such as being an industrial worker). In this way of defining the proletariat, a proletarian class consciousness could be developed through a subjective standpoint with political education supplied by the Chinese Communist Party. This conception of the proletariat allowed for a Marxist theoretical framing under which the revolution could address the relative weakness of industrial working classes in China. Exactly what constituted a proper proletarian class consciousness was subject to intellectual and political debate.

==== Proletarian culture ====
Marx argued that each social class had its characteristic culture and politics. The socialist states stemming from the Russian Revolution championed and created the official version of proletarian culture.

Some have argued that this assessment has become outdated with the advent of mass education, mass communication and globalization. According to this argument, the working-class culture of capitalist countries tend to experience "prole drift" (proletarian drift), in which everything inexorably becomes commonplace and commodified. Examples include best-seller lists, films, music made to appeal to the masses, and shopping malls.

=== Stieglerian approach ===
==== Extension of the Marxist concept ====
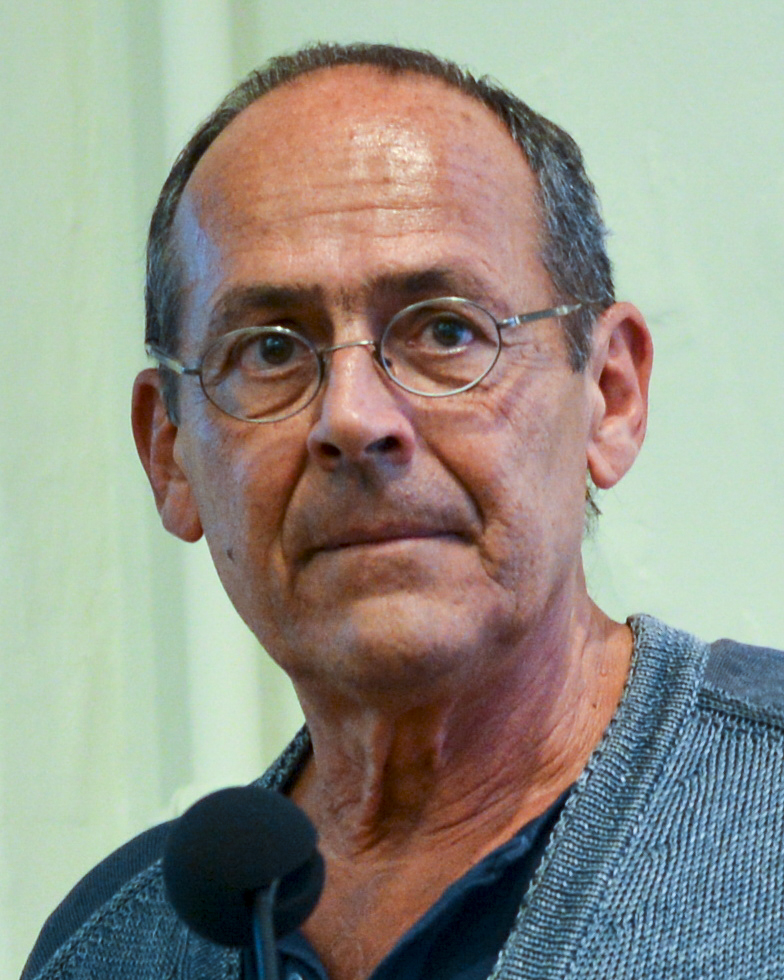
Bernard Stiegler, philosopher of technology.

Through a rereading of the Grundrisse, the philosopher Bernard Stiegler expands the concept of proletariat. According to him,

The proletariat is defined by Engels and Marx in The Communist Manifesto not by impoverishment, but by the loss of knowledge (of which impoverishment is a consequence), and which, they write, will ultimately affect "all strata of the population".

He links this phenomenon to a loss of individuation, a concept developed by Gilbert Simondon:

Simondon offers a new perspective on the question of proletarianization: he frames it as a process of de-individuation that results in a loss of knowledge through its externalization into machines and devices."

According to Stiegler, proletarianization is a process. He identifies three phases of automation throughout the history of capitalism: the Industrial Revolution, the advent of the consumer society, and surveillance capitalism. These phases are accompanied, respectively, by three stages of proletarianization: the proletarianization of technical skills, of social skills, and of critical thinking. The current stage of capitalism is that of "widespread proletarianization", which

affects all tasks: domestic, educational, recreational [...], as well as those carried out by research, design, production, and logistics units, etc.

More broadly, these skills might include cooking, educating, residing in a place, living together, counting or measuring, etc.

==== Examples ====
Stiegler considers the renowned economist Alan Greenspan, who served as chairman of the U.S. Federal Reserve during the subprime crisis, to be a proletarian. Indeed, Greenspan admitted during the congressional hearing that he did not understand the complex financial products he had popularized and, furthermore, that no one understood them.

Anne Alombert, a coworker of Stiegler, considers chatbots a proletarianizing technology when used to delegate linguistic, symbolic, and expressive capacities otherwise retained by their users.

==== Deproletarianization ====
The process of proletarianization can be reversed through what Stiegler calls "deproletarianization", that is, the reappropriation of knowledge. He cites the example of collaborative practices, such as those found in the open-source software community, fab labs, and Wikipedia, which he places at the center of his theory of the contributory economy. All of these practices contribute to the recreation of the commons (including digital commons). For Stiegler, contributors invest themselves

because they want to expand their knowledge and skills. Such a thirst for knowledge is a desire to become deproletarianized.

Deproletarianization goes through a "de-automation". However, Stiegler emphasizes that this does not have to be done in opposition to machines. He cites the example of Wikipedia contributors - of whom he is one - who are assisted by bots for tedious and repetitive tasks.

== See also ==
- Working class – Social class of people working for a living
- Blue-collar worker – Working-class person who performs manual labour
- Consumtariat – global lower class in the framework of netocracy
- Deskilling – Lowering of skill levels by new technology
- Laborer – Worker using physical exertion
- Median income – Macroeconomic indicator
- Peasant – Agricultural laborer or farmer with limited land ownership
- Precariat – Class of wage-earners in a tenuous job situation close to unemployment
- Proles (Nineteen Eighty-Four) – analogue to the proletariat in George Orwell's "Nineteen Eighty-Four"
- Prolefeed – Fictional language in the novel "Nineteen Eighty-Four"
- Proletarianization – Social process of becoming a wage laborer
- Proletarian internationalism – Marxist social class concept
- Proletarian literature – Literature mainly written for or by the working class
- Wage slavery – Term criticizing labor exploitation
