= Capite censi =

Lowest class of citizens of ancient Rome

Capite censi were the lowest class of citizens in ancient Rome, people not of the nobility or middle classes. The term in Latin means "those counted by head" in the ancient Roman census. Also known as "the head count", the capite censi owned little or no property, so they were counted by the head rather than by their property. Initially capite censi was synonymous with proletarii, meaning those citizens whose property was too small to be rated for the census. Later, though, the proletarii were distinguished from the capite censi as having "appreciable property" to the value of 11,000 asses or less. In contrast, the capite censi are assumed to have not owned any property of significance.

== See also ==
- Patrician – Hereditary nobility of ancient Rome
- Plebs – General body of free Roman citizens
- Social class in ancient Rome
