= Aes hordearium =

As allotment

The aes hordearium was an annual allotment of 2,000 asses paid during the Roman Republic to an equus publicus for his military horse's upkeep. This money was paid by single women, which included both maidens and widows (viduae), and orphans (orbi), provided they possessed a certain amount of property, on the principle, as Barthold Georg Niebuhr remarks, "that in a military state, the women and children ought to contribute for those who fight in behalf of them and the commonwealth; it being borne in mind, that they were not included in the census." The equites had a right to distrain (pignoris capio) if the aes hordearium was not paid.

== Attribution ==
This article incorporates text from a free content work. Licensed under Public Domain (license statement/permission). Text taken from Aes Equestre, William Smith, D.C.L., LL.D.:, Bill Thayer. A Dictionary of Greek and Roman Antiquities, John Murray, London, 1875..
