= Tributum capitis =

Poll tax in ancient Rome

The Tributum capitis was a poll tax in ancient Rome.

== History ==
The ancient Romans imposed a tributum capitis (poll tax) as one of the principal direct taxes on the peoples of the Roman provinces. In the Roman Republican period, poll taxes were principally collected by private tax farmers (publicani). From the time under Emperor Augustus, the collections were gradually transferred to magistrates and the senates of provincial cities. The Roman census was conducted periodically in the provinces to draw up and update the poll tax register.

The Roman poll tax fell principally on Roman subjects in the provinces but not on Roman citizens. Towns in the provinces who possessed the ius italicum (enjoying the "privileges of Italy") were exempted from the poll tax. The 212 edict of Emperor Caracalla that formally conferred Roman citizenship on all residents of Roman provinces did not exempt them from the poll tax. The Roman poll tax was deeply resented. Tertullian bewailed the poll tax as a "badge of slavery", and it provoked numerous revolts in the provinces. Perhaps most famous is the first Jewish revolt by the Zealots in Judaea of 66 AD. After the destruction of the temple in 70 AD, the Emperor imposed an extra poll tax on Jews throughout the empire, the fiscus judaicus, of two denarii each.

The Italian revolt of the 720s, organized and led by Pope Gregory II, was originally provoked by the attempt of the Constantinople Emperor Leo III the Isaurian to introduce a poll tax in the Italian provinces of the Byzantine Empire in 722, and set in motion the permanent separation of Italy from the Byzantine empire. When King Aistulf of the Lombards availed himself of the Italian dissent and invaded the Exarchate of Ravenna in 751, one of his first acts was to institute a crushing poll tax of one gold solidus per head on every Roman citizen. Seeking relief from this burden, Pope Stephen II appealed to Pepin the Short of the Franks for assistance; this led to the establishment of the Papal States in 756.

== See also ==
- Tributum
