= Military of ancient Rome =

The military of ancient Rome was one of the largest pre-modern professional standing armies in history. At its height, protecting over 7,000 kilometers of border and consisting of over 400,000 legionaries and auxiliaries, the army was the most important institution in the Roman world. According to the Roman historian Livy, the military was a key element in the rise of Rome over "above seven hundred years" from a small settlement in Latium to the capital of an empire governing a wide region around the shores of the Mediterranean, or, as the Romans themselves said, mare nostrum, "our sea". Livy asserts:

... if any people ought to be allowed to consecrate their origins and refer them to a divine source, so great is the military glory of the Roman People that when they profess that their Father and the Father of their Founder was none other than Mars, the nations of the earth may well submit to this also with as good a grace as they submit to Rome's dominion.

Titus Flavius Josephus, a contemporary historian, sometime high-ranking officer in the Roman army, and commander of the rebels in the Jewish revolt describes the Roman people as if they were "born readily armed". At the time of the two historians, Roman society had already evolved an effective military and had used it to defend itself against the Etruscans, the Italics, the Greeks, the Gauls, the maritime empire of Carthage, and the Macedonian kingdoms. In each war, it acquired more territory until, when the civil war ended the Roman Republic, nothing was left for the first emperor, Augustus, to do except declare it an empire and defend it.

The role and structure of the military were then altered during the empire. It became less Roman, the duties of border protection and territorial administration being more and more taken by foreign mercenaries officered by Romans. When they divided at last into warring factions the empire fell, unable to keep out invading armies.

During the Roman Republic, the function of the military was defined as service to the "Senatus Populusque Romanus" – an agency designated by SPQR on public inscriptions. Its main body was the senate, which met in a building still extant in the forum of Rome. Its decrees were handed off to the two chief officers of the state, the consuls. They could levy from the citizens whatever military force they judged was necessary to execute such decree. This conscription was executed through a draft of male citizens assembled by age class. The officers of the legion were tasked with selecting men for the ranks. The will of the SPQR was binding on the consuls and the men, with the death penalty often assigned for disobedience or failure. The men were under a rigorous code, known now for its punitive crucifixion.

The consular duties were of any type whatever: military defense, police work, public hygiene, assistance in a civil disaster, health work, agriculture, and especially the construction of public roads, bridges, aqueducts, buildings, and the maintenance of such. The soldiers were kept busy doing whatever service needed to be done: soldiering, manning vessels, carpentry, blacksmithing, clerking, etc. They were trained as required, but also previous skills, such as a trade, were exploited. They were brought to the task and were protected by the authority of the state.

The military's campaign history stretched over 1300 years and saw Roman armies campaigning as far east as Parthia (modern-day Iran), as far south as Africa (modern-day Tunisia) and Aegyptus (modern-day Egypt) and as far north as Britannia (modern-day England, southern Scotland, and Wales). The makeup of the Roman military changed substantially over its history, from its early days as an unsalaried citizen militia to a later professional force, the Imperial Roman army. The equipment used by the military altered greatly in type over time, though there were very few technological improvements in weapons manufacture, in common with the rest of the classical world. For much of its history, the vast majority of Rome's forces were maintained at or beyond the limits of its territory, to either expand Rome's domain or protect its existing borders. Expansions were infrequent, as the emperors, adopting a strategy of fixed lines of defense, had determined to maintain existing borders. For that purpose, they constructed extensive walls and created permanent stations that became cities.

== Personnel ==
=== Population base of the early empire ===
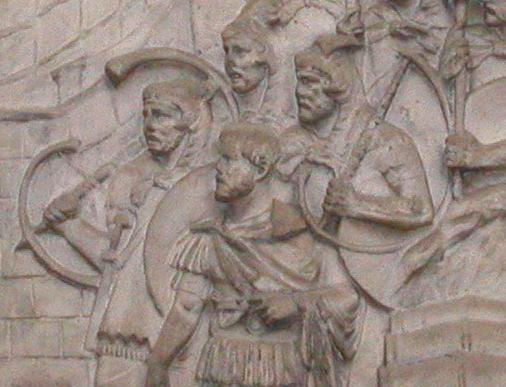
Roman soldiers on the cast of Trajan's Column in the Victoria and Albert Museum, London

At its territorial height, the Roman Empire may have contained between 45 million and 120 million people. Historian Edward Gibbon estimated that the size of the Roman army "most probably formed a standing force of three hundred and seventy-five thousand men" at the empire's territorial peak in the time of the Roman emperor Hadrian (r. 117–138). This estimate probably included only legionary and auxiliary troops of the Roman army. However, Gibbon states that it is "not... easy to define the size of the Roman military with any tolerable accuracy". In the late imperial period, when vast numbers of foederati were employed by the Romans, Antonio Santosuosso (2001) estimated the combined number of men in arms of the two Roman empires numbered closer to 700,000 in total (not all members of a standing army), drawing on data from the Notitia Dignitatum. However, he notes that these figures were probably subject to inflation due to the practice of leaving dead soldiers "on the books" to continue to draw their wages and ration. Furthermore, it is irrespective of whether the troops were raised by the Romans or simply hired by them to fight on their behalf.

=== Recruitment ===
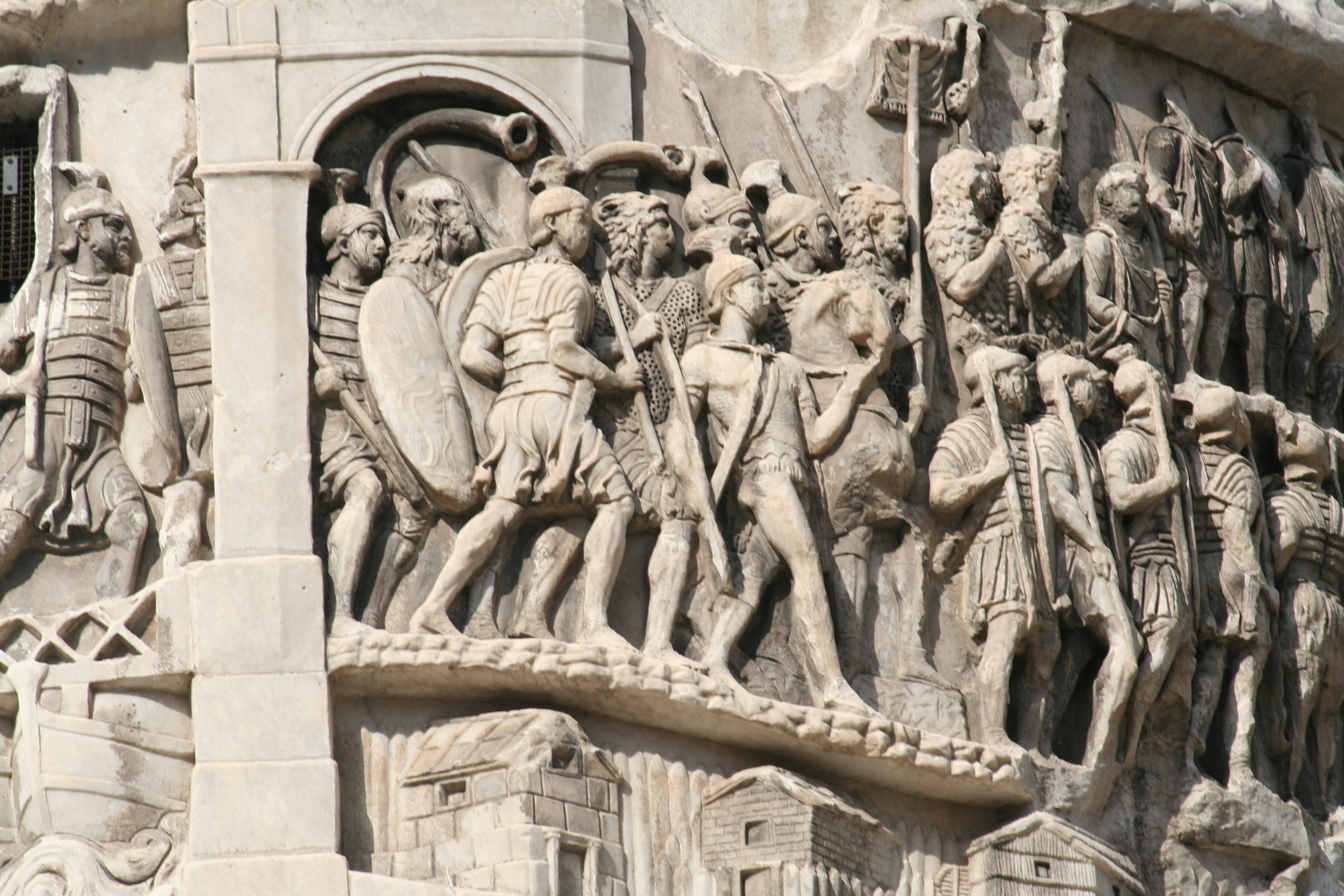
Relief scene of Roman legionaries marching, from the Column of Marcus Aurelius, Rome, Italy, 2nd century AD

Initially, Rome's military consisted of an annual citizen levy performing military service as part of their duty to the state. During this period, the Roman army prosecuted seasonal campaigns against largely local adversaries. As the extent of the territories falling under Roman suzerainty expanded, and the size of the city's forces increased, the soldiery of ancient Rome became increasingly professional and salaried. As a consequence, military service at the lower (non-staff) levels became progressively longer-term. Roman military units of the period were largely homogeneous and highly regulated. The army consisted of units of citizen infantry known as legions (Latin: legio) as well as non-legionary allied troops known as auxiliary. The latter were most commonly called upon to provide light infantry or cavalry support.

Military service in the later empire continued to be salaried yearly and professionally for Rome's regular troops. However, the trend of employing allied or mercenary troops was expanded such that these troops came to represent a substantial proportion of Rome's forces. At the same time, the uniformity of structure found in Rome's earlier military forces disappeared. The soldiery of the era ranged from lightly armed mounted archers to heavy infantry, in regiments of varying size and quality. This was accompanied by a trend in the late empire of an increasing predominance of cavalry rather than infantry troops, as well as an emphasis on more mobile operations.

=== Military subculture ===
The British historian Peter Heather describes Roman military culture as being "just like the Marines, but much nastier". The army did not provide much social mobility, and it also took quite some time to complete one's service. The pay was not the best for the time but could be remedied by advance in rank, loot from wars, and additional pay from emperors. Also, the army did provide a guaranteed supply of food (often, soldiers had to pay for food and supplies), doctors, and stability. In the legions of the Republic, discipline was fierce and training harsh, all intended to instill a spirit of group cohesion or esprit de corps that could bind the men together into effective fighting units. Unlike opponents such as the Gauls, who were fierce individual warriors, Roman military training concentrated on instilling teamwork and maintaining a level head over individual bravery − troops were to maintain exact formations in battle and "despise wild swinging blows" in favor of taking shelter behind one's shield and delivering efficient stabs when an opponent made himself vulnerable.

Loyalty was to the Roman state but pride was based in the soldier's unit, to which was attached a military standard − in the case of the legions a legionary eagle. Successful units were awarded accolades that became part of their official name, such as the 20th Legion, which became the XX Valeria Victrix (the "Valiant and Victorious 20th").

Of the martial culture of less valued units such as sailors and light infantry, less is known, but it is doubtful that its training was as intense or its esprit de corps as strong as in the legions.

Literacy was highly valued in the Roman military, and literacy rates in the military far exceeded that of the Roman society as a whole.

== Funding and expenditures ==
=== Private funding ===
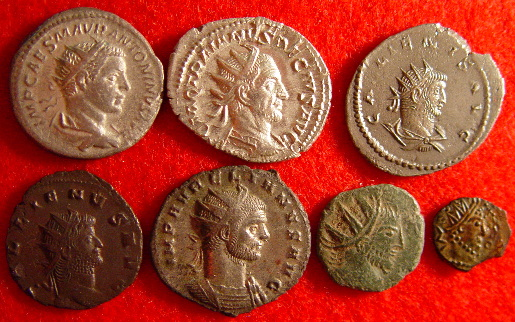
Roman coins grew gradually more debased due to the demands placed on the treasury of the Roman state by the military.

Although early in its history, troops were expected to provide much of their equipment, eventually, the Roman military became almost entirely funded by the state. Since soldiers of the early republican armies were also unpaid citizens, the financial burden of the army on the state was minimal. However, since the Roman state did not provide services such as housing, health, education, social security, and public transport that are part and parcel of modern states, the military always represented by far the greatest expenditure of the state.

=== Plunder economy ===
During the time of expansion in the Republic and early Empire, Roman armies had acted as a source of revenue for the Roman state, plundering conquered territories, displaying the massive wealth in triumphs upon their return and fuelling the economy to the extent that historians such as Toynbee and Burke believe that the Roman economy was essentially a plunder economy. Nathan Rosenstein has questioned this assumption, indicating that Rome ran the majority of its campaigns in the 2nd century BC at a loss and relied on rare windfalls such as Aemilius Paullus' campaign in the east in 168 BC to make up the cost of war. Regardless, after the empire had stopped expanding in the 2nd century AD, this source of revenue dried up; by the end of the 3rd century AD, Rome had "ceased to vanquish". As tax revenue was plagued by corruption and hyperinflation during the Crisis of the Third Century, military expenditures began to become a "crushing burden" on the finances of the Roman state. It now highlighted weaknesses that earlier expansion had disguised. By 440 AD, an imperial law frankly states that the Roman state has insufficient tax revenue to fund an army of a size required by the demands placed upon it.

Several additional factors bloated the military expenditure of the Roman Empire. First, substantial rewards were paid to "barbarian" chieftains for their good conduct in the form of negotiated subsidies and the provision of allied troops. Secondly, the military boosted its numbers, possibly by one third in a single century. Third, the military increasingly relied on a higher ratio of cavalry units in the late empire, which were many times more expensive to maintain than infantry units.

=== Taxation ===
As military size and costs increased, new taxes were introduced or existing tax laws reformed in the late empire to finance it, even though more inhabitants were available within the borders of the late empire, reducing the per capita costs for an increased standing army was impractical. A large number of the population could not be taxed because they were slaves or held Roman citizenship, both of which exempted them from taxation. Of the remaining, a large number were already impoverished by centuries of warfare and weakened by chronic malnutrition. Still, they had to handle an increasing tax rate and so they often abandoned their lands to survive in a city.

Of the western empire's taxable population, a larger number than in the east could not be taxed because they were "primitive subsistence peasant[s]" and did not produce a great deal of goods beyond agricultural products. Plunder was still made from suppressing insurgencies within the empire and on limited incursions into enemy land. Legally, much of it should have returned to the imperial purse, but these goods were simply kept by the common soldiers, who demanded it of their commanders as a right. Given the low wages and high inflation in the later Empire, the soldiers felt that they had a right to acquire plunder.

== Capabilities ==
=== Readiness and disposition ===
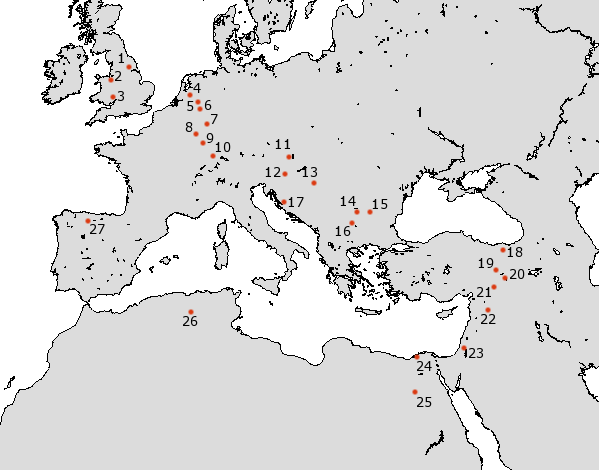
Locations of Roman legions, 80 AD

The military capability of Rome – its preparedness or readiness – was always primarily based upon the maintenance of an active fighting force acting either at or beyond its military frontiers, something that historian Luttwak refers to as a "thin linear perimeter. This is best illustrated by showing the dispositions of the Roman legions, the backbone of the Roman army. Because of these deployments, the Roman military kept a central strategic reserve after the Social War. Such reserves were only re-established during the late empire when the army was split into a border defense force and mobile response field units.

=== Power projection ===
The Roman military was keen on the doctrine of power projection – it frequently removed foreign rulers by force or intimidation and replaced them with puppets. This was facilitated by the maintenance, for at least part of its history, of a series of client states and other subjugated and buffer entities beyond its official borders, although over which Rome extended massive political influence and military threat to keep them loyal. However, this could also lead to the payment of immense subsidies to foreign powers to keep a frontier quiet.

=== Logistics ===
The empire's system of building an extensive and well-maintained road network, as well as its absolute command of the Mediterranean for much of its history, enabled a primitive form of rapid reaction, also stressed in modern military doctrine. During the imperial period, some border regions had limites built, forts that would sustain a Roman presence, deal with small incursions themselves, and slow down larger incursion to enable aid to be sent.

The Roman military had an extensive logistical supply chain. There was no specialised branch of the military devoted to logistics and transportation, although this was to a great extent carried out by the Roman navy due to the ease and low costs of transporting goods via sea and river compared to overland. Work managing supplies and logistics was probably part of the standard career path of Roman elites, something acquired while working as military tribunes managing foraging expeditions, and reinforced in later positions. There is archaeological evidence that Roman armies campaigning in Germania were supplied by a logistical supply chain beginning in Italy and Gaul, then transported by sea to the northern coast of Germania, and finally penetrating Germania via barges on inland waterways. Forces were routinely supplied via fixed supply chains. Roman armies in enemy territory obtained their food many ways simultaneously; they would forage for food, purchase food locally, raid local foodstores, and have food shipped to them by supply lines. Peter Heather writes that a single legion would have required 13.5 tonnes of food per month, and attempting to get all that food in just a single way would have proved impossible.

=== Policing ===
For the most part, Roman cities had a civil guard used for maintaining peace. Due to fear of rebellions and other uprisings, they were forbidden to be armed at militia levels. Policing was split between the city guard for low-level affairs and the Roman legions and auxiliary for suppressing higher-level rioting and rebellion. This civil guard created a limited strategic reserve, one that fared poorly in actual warfare.

=== Engineering ===
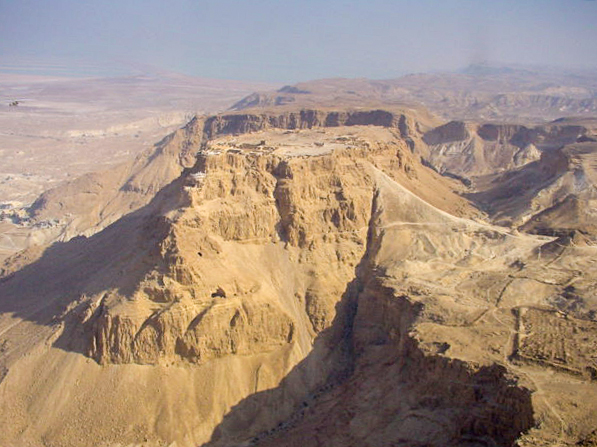
The massive earthen ramp at Masada, designed by the Roman army to breach the fortress' walls

The military engineering of Ancient Rome's armed forces was of a scale and frequency far beyond that of any of its contemporaries. Indeed, military engineering was in many ways institutionally endemic in Roman military culture, as demonstrated by the fact that each Roman legionary had as part of his equipment a shovel, alongside his gladius (sword) and pila (spears). Heather writes that "Learning to build, and build quickly, was a standard element of training".

This engineering prowess was, however, only evident during the peak of Roman military prowess from the mid-republic to the mid-empire. Before the mid-republic period, there is little evidence of protracted or exceptional military engineering, and in the late empire likewise, there is little sign of the kind of engineering feats that were regularly carried out in the earlier empire.

Roman military engineering took both routine and extraordinary forms, the former a proactive part of standard military procedure, and the latter of an extraordinary or reactionary nature. Proactive military engineering took the form of the regular construction of fortified camps, in road-building, and the construction of siege engines. The knowledge and experience learned through such routine engineering lent itself readily to any extraordinary engineering projects required by the army, such as the circumvallations constructed at Alesia and the earthen ramp constructed at Masada.

This engineering expertise practiced in daily routines also served in the construction of siege equipment such as ballistae, onagers and siege towers, as well as allowing the troops to construct roads, bridges, and fortified camps. All of these led to strategic capabilities, allowing Roman troops to, respectively, assault besieged settlements, move more rapidly to wherever they were needed, cross rivers to reduce march times and surprise enemies, and to camp in relative security even in enemy territory.

== International stance ==
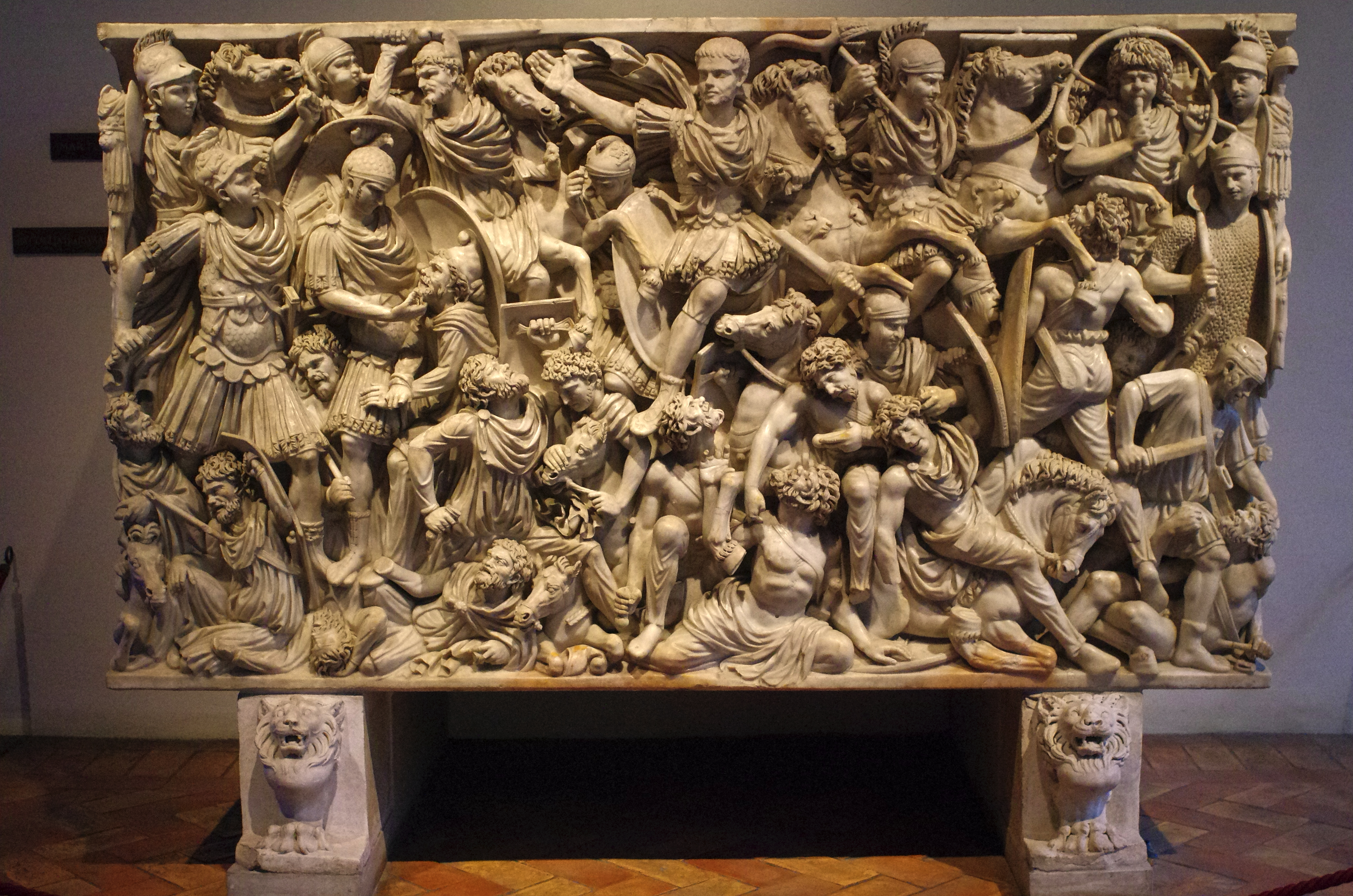
Third-century Roman soldiers battling barbarian troops on the Ludovisi Battle sarcophagus (250–260)

Rome was established as a nation by making aggressive use of its high military potential. From very early on in its history, it would raise two armies annually to campaign abroad. The Roman military was far from being solely a defense force. For much of its history, it was a tool of aggressive expansion. The Roman army had derived from a militia of main farmers and the gain of new farmlands for the growing population or later retiring soldiers was often one of the campaign's chief objectives. Only in the late empire did the preservation of control over Rome's territories become the Roman military's primary role. The remaining major powers confronting Rome were the Kingdom of Aksum, Parthia and the Hunnic Empire. Knowledge of China, the Han dynasty at the times of Mani, existed and it is believed that Rome and China swapped embassies in about 170 AD.

=== Grand strategy ===
In its purest form, the concept of strategy deals solely with military issues. However, Rome is offered by Edward Luttwak and others as an early example of a state that possessed a grand strategy which encompassed the management of the resources of an entire nation in the conduct of warfare. Up to half of the funds raised by the Roman state were spent on its military, and the Romans displayed a strategy that was more complicated than simple knee-jerk strategic or tactical responses to individual threats. Rome's strategy changed over time, implementing different systems to meet different challenges that reflected changing internal priorities. Elements of Rome's strategy included the use of client states, the deterrent of armed response in parallel with manipulative diplomacy, and a fixed system of troop deployments and road networks. Luttwak states that there are "instructive similarities" between Roman and modern military strategy.

Rome would rely on brute force and sheer numbers when in doubt. The soldiers were trained to memorize every step in battle, so discipline and order could not break down into chaos. They were largely successful because of this.

== Equipment ==
Although Roman iron-working was enhanced by a process known as carburizing, the Romans are not thought to have developed true steel production. From the earliest history of the Roman state to its downfall, Roman arms were therefore uniformly produced from either bronze or, later, iron. As a result, the 1300 years of Roman military technology saw little radical change at the technological level. Within the bounds of classical military technology, however, Roman arms and armor were developed, discarded, and adopted from other peoples based on changing methods of engagement. It included at various times stabbing daggers and swords, stabbing or thrusting swords, long thrusting spears or pikes, lances, light throwing javelins and darts, slings, and bow and arrows.

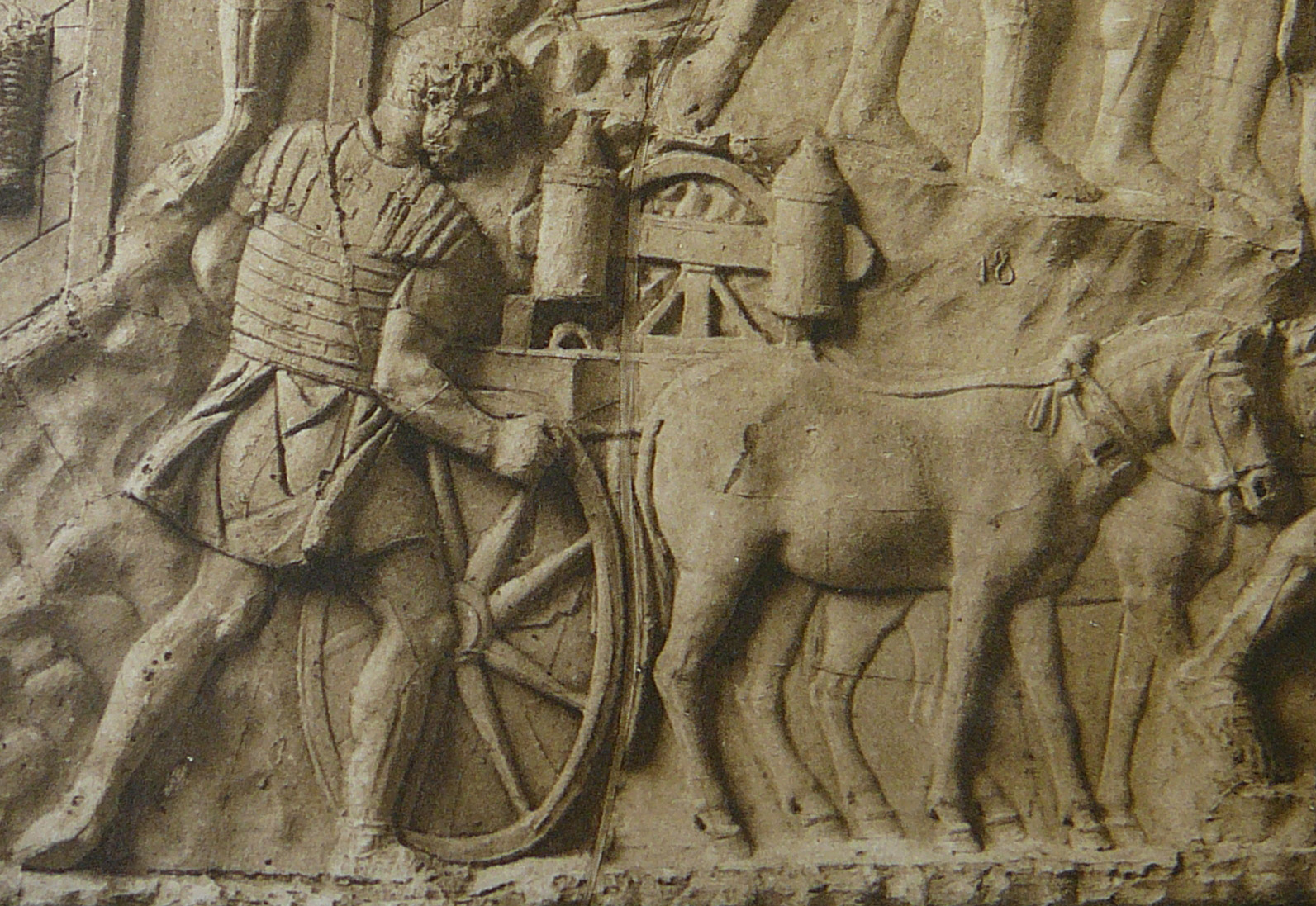
Relief from Trajan's Column showing a legionary with lorica segmentata, manning a carroballista

Roman military personal equipment was produced in large numbers to established patterns and used in an established way. It, therefore, varied little in design and quality within each historical period. According to Hugh Elton, Roman equipment gave them "a distinct advantage over their barbarian enemies." Elton, Hugh, 1996, "Warfare in Roman Europe, AD 350–425", who were often, as Germanic tribesmen, completely unarmoured. However, Luttwak points out that whilst the uniform possession of armour gave Rome an advantage, the actual standard of each item of Roman equipment was of no better quality than that used by the majority of its adversaries. In Luttwack, E., "The Grand Strategy of the Roman Empire", JHUP, 1979, Luttwack states that "Roman weapons, far from being universally more advanced, were frequently inferior to those used by enemies. The relatively low quality of Roman weaponry was primarily a function of its large-scale production, and later factors such as governmental price-fixing for certain items, which gave no allowance for quality and incentivized cheap, poor-quality goods.

The Roman military readily adopted types of arms and armor that were effectively used against them by their enemies. Initially, Roman troops were armed after Greek and Etruscan models, using large oval shields and long pikes. On encountering the Celts they adopted much Celtic equipment and again later adopted items such as the gladius from Iberian peoples. Later in Rome's history, it adopted practices such as arming its cavalry with bows in the Parthian style and even experimented briefly with niche weaponry such as elephants and camel-troops.

Besides personal weaponry, the Roman military adopted team weaponry such as the ballista and developed a naval weapon known as the corvus, a spiked plank used for affixing and boarding enemy ships.

== Medicine ==
=== Need for specialized care ===
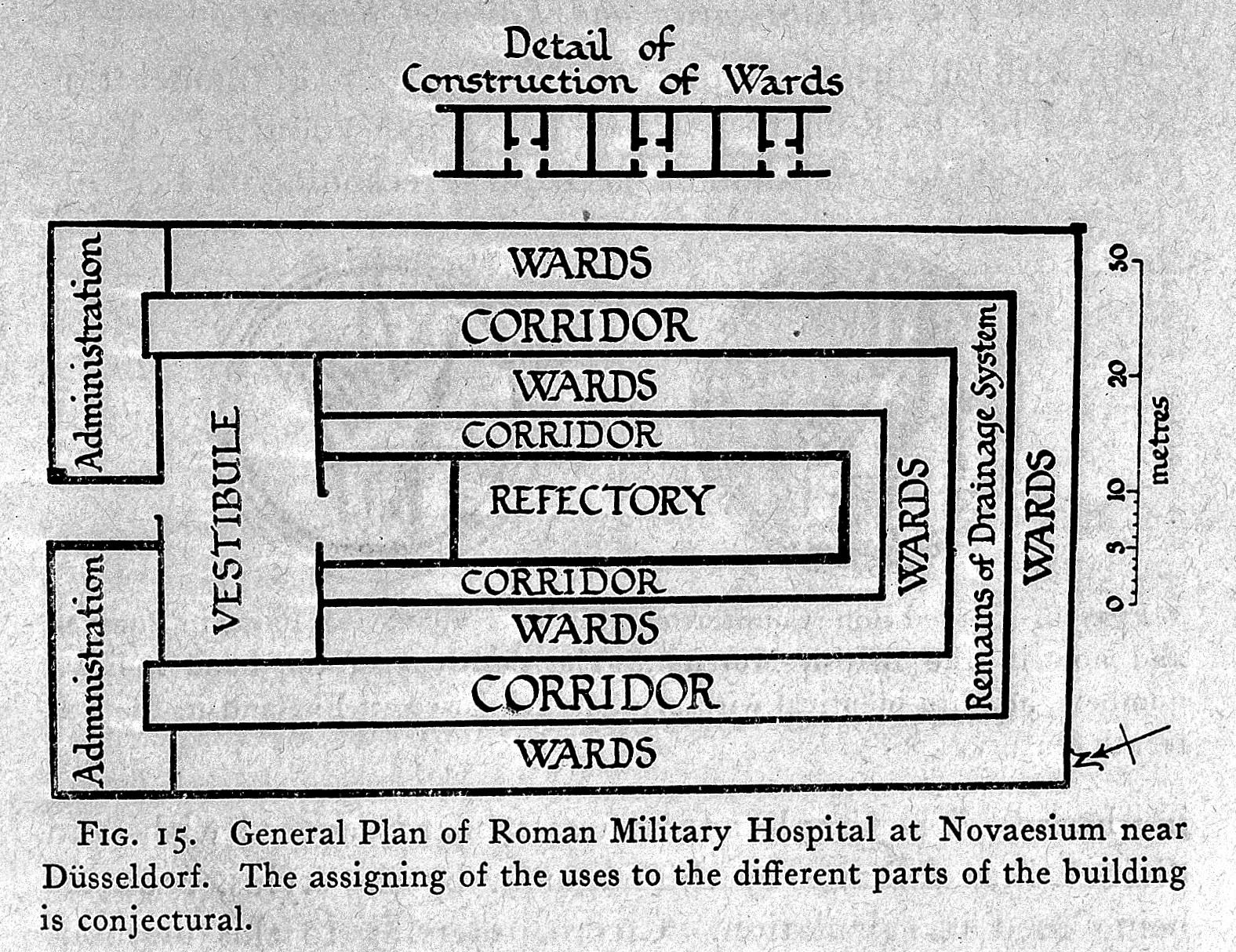
General set up of ancient Roman military hospital.

The expansion of the Roman Empire was achieved through military force in nearly every case. Roman culture as a whole revolved around its military for both expansion and protection. Geographic areas on the outskirts of the empire were prone to attack and required heavy military presence. The constant barrage of attacks and the increase of expansion caused casualties. Due to attack there was a need for specialized medical care for these armies in order to keep them in operational status. The specialized form of care however, was not created until the time of Augustus (r. 27 BC – AD 14). Prior to this there is little information about the care of soldiers. It is assumed soldiers were self-reliant, treating their own wounds and caring for other ailments encountered. They would also turn to civilians for help throughout the villages they would come across. This was considered a custom of the time, and was quite common for households to take in wounded soldiers and tend to them. As time progressed, there was an increase in care for the wounded as hospitals appeared. The idea was held by the Romans that a healed soldier was better than a dead one and a healed veteran was better than a new recruit.

=== Roman hospitals ===
With the need for soldier health a growing concern, places for the sick to go in the army were starting to show up. Dates ranged from AD 9 to AD 50, but this is when the first evidence of hospitals was seen in archeological remains. These hospitals were specific places for only military members to go to if they were injured or fell ill. Similar hospitals were set up for slaves in areas where slaves were used in large numbers. Military hospitals were permanent structures set up in forts. These buildings had clear patient rooms and were designed to accommodate large numbers of soldiers. The size of these hospitals varied based on their location. Some of the large facilities, such as the hospital in Hod Hill England, was large enough to accommodate roughly 12% of the force within the hospital. In more stable areas such as Inchtuthil in Scotland, there was room for as little as 2% of the force within the hospital. In areas with more conflict, there were larger medical facilities as they saw more casualties. These hospitals were solely designed for the use of the military. If a civilian fell ill or needed surgery they would likely go to the physician's home and stay, not a hospital. Prior to these permanent structures there were tents set up as mobile field hospitals. Soldiers suffering from severe wounds were brought to these for treatment. These were quickly assembled and disassembled as the army moved. The tents served as a precursor for the permanent structured hospitals. These permanent hospitals and mobile treatment centers were a relatively new concept in this time period.

=== Physicians ===
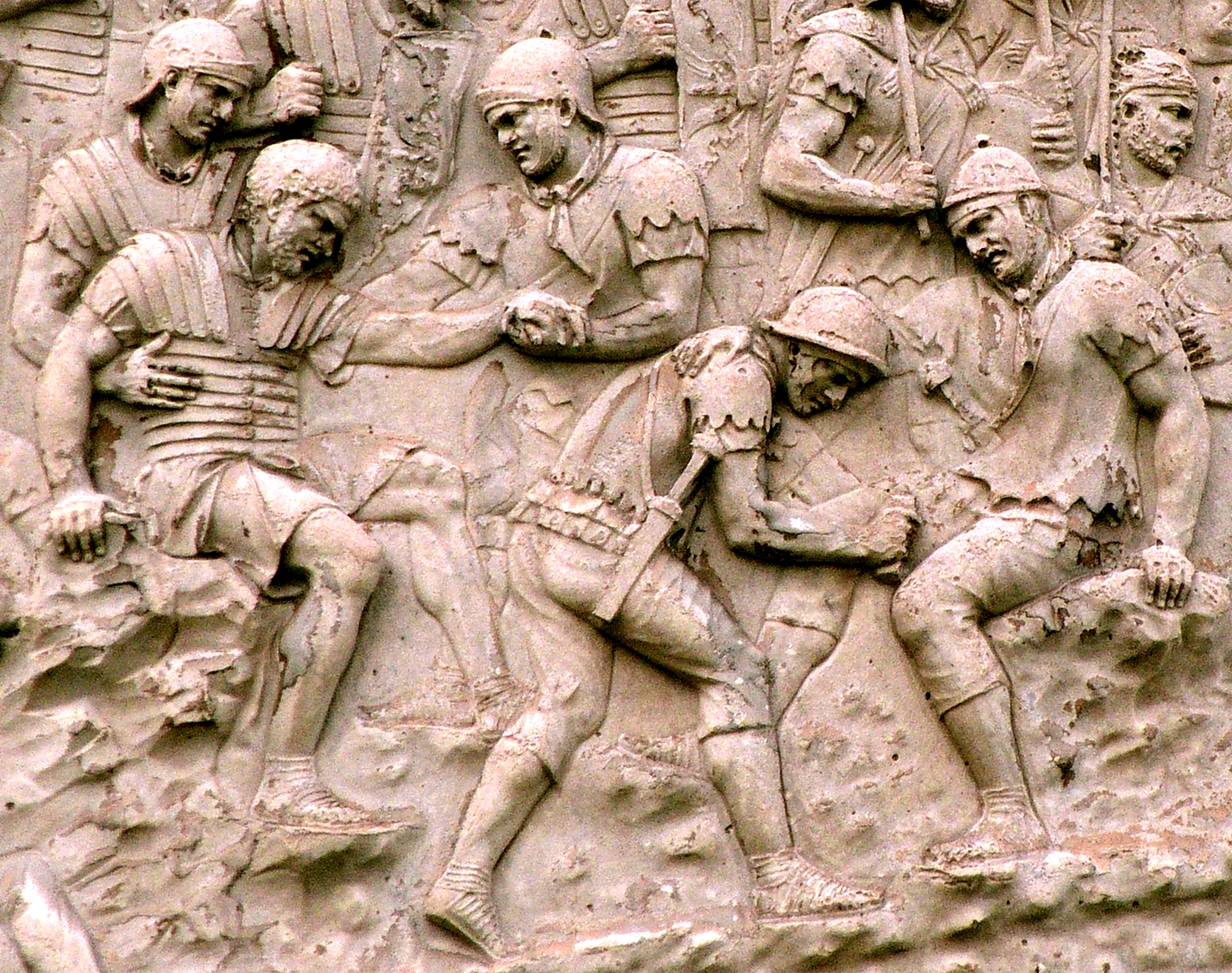
Capsarii tending to injured soldiers depicted on Trajan's Column

Doctors serving in the army were considered to be a member of the military. Just like everyone else they would take the military oath and be bound by the military law. They would also start among the lower fighting ranks. Even though they took the military oath and were among the lower ranks it did not mean they would be fighting among the masses. These doctors were not always professionals or career physicians. Oftentimes they were slaves who were forced into that career.

The capsarii were a group that also treated wounded soldiers on the battlefield. These men were not trained physicians even though they played the role of one. Typically they were soldiers who demonstrated they had knowledge in wound treatment and even simple surgical techniques. These men were used before the actual trained doctors were largely implemented. Physicians got their knowledge from experience and information being passed down from person to person. Likely they never used medical texts, as it was not commonplace even in the civilian field. Generals and emperors were exceptions, as they would typically have their physicians with them. This was a common occurrence as emperors such as Marcus Aurelius employed famous physicians such as Galen. There were also physicians among the ranks of the Roman soldiers.

=== Distinctions in practice ===
With any large number of people being in close quarters, there was a constant threat of disease. When one individual in a large group gets sick with a communicable disease, it spreads to others very quickly. This premise remains true even today in the modern military. The Romans recognized the difference between disease and wounds, each requiring separate treatment. Drainage of excess water and waste were common practices in camps as well as the permanent medical structures, which come at a later date. As the medical corps grew in size there was also specialization evolving. Physicians surfaced that specialized in disease, surgery, wound dressing and even veterinary medicine.

Veterinary physicians were there to tend to livestock for agricultural purposes as well as combat purposes. The Roman cavalry was known for their use of horses in combat and scouting purposes. Because of the type of injuries that would have been commonly seen, surgery was a somewhat common occurrence. Tools such as scissors, knives and arrow extractors have been found in remains. In fact, Roman surgery was quite intuitive, in contrast to common thought of ancient surgery. The Roman military surgeons used a cocktail of plants, which created a sedative similar to modern anesthesia. Written documentation also showed surgeons used oxidation from a metal such as copper and scrape it into wounds, which provided an antibacterial effect; however, this method was most likely more toxic than providing an actual benefit. Doctors had the knowledge to clean their surgical instruments with hot water after each use. Wounds were dressed, and dead tissue was removed when bandages were changed. Honey and cobwebs were items used to cover wounds, and have even been shown today to increase healing. Because of the wide array of cases, it was not uncommon for surgeons to begin their careers in the army to learn their trade. Physicians such as Galen and Dioscorides served in the military. Most major advancements in knowledge and technique came from the military rather than civil practice.

=== Diet ===
Diet was an issue that is often discussed throughout this time as an aspect of medical care. Since our idea of modern technology did not exist, diet was a simple way for Romans to attain a healthy life. This remained true in the Roman military, as soldiers required appropriate nutrition in order to function at high activity levels. Because of the number of the people requiring food, there were some unique ways to go about the acquisition of food. During a campaign, the soldiers would often forage food from their enemy's land. In fact, as part of the standard kit, Roman soldiers would carry a sickle, which would be used for foraging. They would also carry a three-day ration of food in case they were in a situation where they couldn't forage. This would largely consist of items such as wheat and barley.

During a time of peace, the Roman army would have had a typical diet of bacon, cheese, vegetables, and beer to drink. Corn is mentioned in their works as well; however, this was a common term that was applied to their use of grain. The Roman use of the term corn is not to be confused with maize, which did not come to Europe until the discovery of the New World. Items such as poultry and fish were also likely part of the standard diet. The soldier was given a ration, which was taken from his pay. This shows that the soldiers were well-fed in times of peace. If the soldiers were well fed, they were healthier and able to maintain a high level of physical activity, as well as to stave off disease, as disease is easier to prevent rather than treat. This idea holds in the event a fort was under siege; certain food items were rationed such as poultry. The reasoning behind this was that poultry was very inexpensive to maintain, especially in the event of a siege. It was also noted that poultry had benefits for those who were sick. This demonstrates the idea was present that the army needed to maintain the health of its members regardless of the circumstances. These discoveries were made while looking at the remains of Roman military sites. By excavating these sites and looking at fecal matter found, scientists were able to determine what was eaten. It is a simple fact that poor diet negatively affects a military's combat readiness. The variety of food found shows the Romans were not focused on just caloric intake, but also variety, as they knew a variety of food was important to health.

=== Scale ===
By the time of Trajan (r. 98–117), the medical corps was well on the way to being an organized machine. At this time, physicians were attached to nearly every army and navy unit in all the Roman military. By this time the army was massive, consisting of twenty-five to thirty legions, each of which contained nearly 6,000 men. Each one included both soldiers and physicians. Despite these large numbers there was still no formal requirements for being a physician. At this point all physicians were either self-taught or learned their trade through an apprenticeship. Despite this, there was an attempt at organization, as the army did have a medical manual that was passed out to its physicians. The medici were used on both the front line as emergency care providers and in the rear as the main physicians. The capsarii'' were mainly used as the front line care providers and bandages, but also assisted the medici behind the lines.

=== Source of knowledge ===
Romans received their medical knowledge largely from the ancient Greeks. As Rome started to expand, it slowly embraced the Greek culture, causing an influx of medicinal information in Roman society. Because of this influx, it allowed this knowledge to become the foundation of all Western medical tradition. The Greek theories were kept alive and their practices continued well into the future. This knowledge was also the foundation used in military medicine since it contained the overarching ideas of their medical knowledge. As time progressed these medical texts would be translated into Arabic and then back into Latin as the flow of information changed. Based on this, one can presume that some of the information in these texts has been lost in translation. Despite this, scholars are still able to establish a clear picture of what military medicine was like during the reign of the Roman Empire.

== See also ==
- Military history of ancient Rome
- Political history of the Roman military
- Veteran (Roman history)
- Auxilia
- Legionary
- Service in the Roman Army by Roy W Davies
