= Military history of ancient Rome =

The military history of ancient Rome is inseparable from its political system, based from an early date upon competition within the ruling elite. Two consuls were elected each year to head the government of the state, and in the early to mid-Republic were assigned a consular army and an area in which to campaign.

== History ==
From Gaius Marius and Sulla onwards, control of the army began to be tied into the political ambitions of individuals, leading to the political triumvirate of the 1st century BC and its resolution in a civil war that led to the Republic's collapse. The Empire was increasingly plagued by usurpations led or supported by military conspiracies, leading to the Crisis of the Third Century (235–284 AD) in the late empire and eventual final decline.

Following is a list of topics on the military history of ancient Rome.

- Structural history of the Roman military

The branches of the Roman military at the highest level were the Roman army and the Roman navy. Within these branches the actual structure was subject to substantial change throughout its history.

- Campaign history of the Roman military

The history of Rome is inseparable from its military history over the roughly thirteen centuries that the Roman state existed. The core of the military campaigns of ancient Rome is the account of the Roman military's land battles, from the conquest of Italy to its fights against the Huns and invading Germanic peoples. Naval battles were largely less important, although there are notable exceptions during, for instance, the First Punic War and others.

The Roman army battled first against its tribal neighbors and Etruscan towns within Italy, and later came to dominate much of the land surrounding the Mediterranean Sea, including the provinces of Britannia and Asia Minor at the Empire's height.

- Technological history of the Roman military

From sticks and stones to ballistae and quinqueremes.

- Political history of the Roman military

From subjects of the state to subjects of the general.

- Siege (Roman history)
