= Strategy of the Roman military =

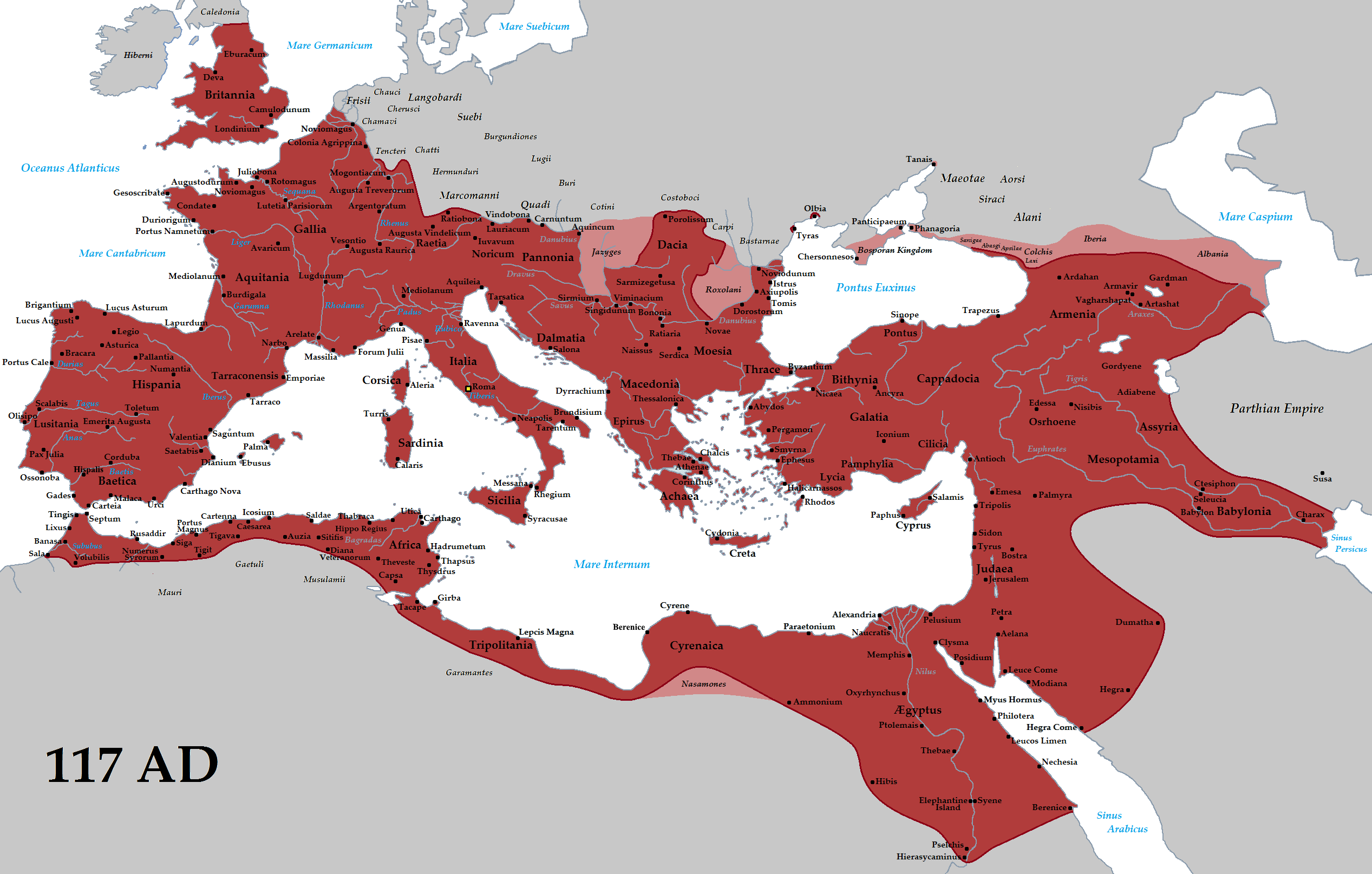
Roman Empire Trajan 117 AD

The strategy of the Roman military contains its grand strategy (the arrangements made by the state to implement its political goals through a selection of military goals, a process of diplomacy backed by threat of military action, and a dedication to the military of part of its production and resources), operational strategy (the coordination and combination of the military forces and their tactics for the goals of an overarching strategy) and, on a small scale, its military tactics (methods for military engagement in order to defeat the enemy). If a fourth rung of "engagement" is added, then the whole can be seen as a ladder, with each level from the foot upwards representing a decreasing concentration on military engagement. Whereas the purest form of tactics or engagement are those free of political imperative, the purest form of political policy does not involve military engagement. Strategy as a whole is the connection between political policy and the use of force to achieve it.

== Main strategy ==
In its clearest form, strategy deals solely with military issues: either a threat or an opportunity is recognised, an evaluation is made, and a military stratagem for meeting it is devised. However, as Clausewitz stated, a successful military strategy may be a means to an end, but it is not an end in itself. Where a state has a long term political goal to which it applies military methods and the resources of the state, that state can be said to have a grand strategy. To an extent, all states will have a grand strategy to a certain degree even if it is simply determining which forces to raise as a military, or how to arm them. Whilst early Rome did raise and arm troops, they tended to raise them annually in response to the specific demands of the state during that year. Such a reactive policy, whilst possibly more efficient than the maintenance of a standing army, does not indicate the close ties between long-term political goals and military organization demanded by grand strategy.

Early indications for a Roman grand strategy emerged during the Punic Wars with Carthage, in which Rome was able to influence the course of the war by selecting to ignore the armies of Hannibal threatening its homeland and to invade Africa instead in order to dictate the primary theater of war.

== Operational strategy ==
Vegetius once wrote that "every plan... is to be considered, every expedient tried and every method taken before matters are brought to this last extremity [general engagements]... Good officers decline general engagements where the odds are too great, and prefer the employment of stratagem and finesse to destroy the enemy as much as possible... without exposing their own forces.". However, Vegetius was writing late in the fourth century AD, in the latter years of the Empire. During this period, and for much of the Empire, it can be argued that the Romans did follow a grand strategy calling for limited direct operational engagement. However, earlier in its history, in the Republic and early Empire Rome showed little reluctance to become engaged in direct military engagement, prosecuting offensive operations against numerous adversaries.

When a campaign did go badly wrong, operational strategy varied greatly as the circumstances dictated, from naval actions to sieges, assaults of fortified positions and open battle. However, the preponderance of Roman campaigns exhibit a preference for direct engagement in open battle and, where necessary, the overcoming of fortified positions via military engineering. The Roman army was adept at building fortified camps for protection from enemy attack, but history shows a reluctance to sit in the camp awaiting battle and a history of seeking open battle.

== Infantry tactics ==
Roman armies of the Republic and early empire worked from a set tactical 'handbook', a military tradition of deploying forces that provided for few variations and was ignored or elaborated only on occasion.

=== Tactical pre-battle maneuvers ===
Once the legion had deployed on an operation, they would generally march to their objective. There were exceptions when the armies were transported by the Roman navy but even then in most instances this was followed by a march of several days or weeks. The approach to the battlefield was made in several columns, enhancing maneuver. Typically a strong vanguard preceded the main body, and included scouts, cavalry and light troops. A tribune or other officer often accompanied the vanguard to survey the terrain for possible camp locations. Flank and recon elements were also deployed to provide the usual covering security. Behind the vanguard came the main body of heavy infantry. Each legion marched as a distinct formation and was accompanied by its own baggage train.

At the end of a day's march, the Romans would typically establish a strong field camp called a castra, complete with palisade and a deep ditch, providing a basis for supply storage, troop marshalling and defence. Streets were laid out, units designated to take specific places, and guards posted at carefully designed gates. Construction could take between 2 and 5 hours with part of the army laboring, while the rest stood guard, depending on the tactical situation. No other ancient army persisted over such a long period in systematic camp construction like the Romans, even if the army rested for only a single day. This concentration of conservative security in deployment was mirrored both in the measured tactics of engagement for the infantry and by the largely conservative operational strategies employed.

=== Tactical deployment ===
The Roman heavy infantry typically was deployed, as the main body, facing the enemy, in three approximately equal lines, with the cavalry or equites on their wings to prevent them being flanked and turned, and light infantry in a screen in front of them to hide maneuvers of the heavy infantry, harass the enemy forces and, in some cases, drive off units such as elephants that would be a great threat to close-order heavy infantry. They were deployed in a quincunx checkered pattern. Alternative tactical formations were adopted occasionally.

=== Tactical engagement ===
In the same way that Roman tactical maneuver was measured and cautious, so too was their actual engagement of the enemy. The soldiers were long-term service professionals whose interest lay in gaining a large pension and an allocation of land on retirement from the army, rather than in seeking glory on the battlefield as a warrior. The tactics of engagement largely reflected this, concentrating on maintaining formation order and protecting individual troops rather than pushing aggressively to destroy the maximum number of enemy troops in a wild charge.

A battle usually opened with light troops skirmishing with the opposition. These light forces then withdrew to the flanks or between the gaps in the central line of heavy infantry. Cavalry might be launched against their opposing numbers or used to screen the central core from envelopment. As the gap between the contenders closed, the heavy infantry typically took the initiative, attacking on the double. The front ranks usually cast their pila, and the following ranks hurled theirs over the heads of the front-line fighters. If a cast pilum did not cause direct death or injury, they were so designed that the hard iron triangular points would stick into enemy shields, bending on their soft metal shafts, weighing down the shields and making them unusable.

After the pila were cast, the soldiers then drew their swords and engaged the enemy. However, rather than charging as might be assumed, great emphasis was placed on the protection gained from sheltering behind the scutum and remaining unexposed, stabbing out from behind the protection of the shield whenever an exposed enemy presented himself. Fresh troops were fed in from the rear, through the "checkboard" arrangement, to relieve the injured and exhausted further ahead.

Many Roman battles, especially during the late empire, were fought with the preparatory bombardment from ballistas and onagers. These war machines, a form of ancient artillery, launched arrows and large stones towards the enemy, proving most effective against close-order formations and structures.
