= Political history of the Roman military =

Rome's military was always tightly keyed to its political system. In the Roman Kingdom the social standing of a person impacted both his political and military roles, which were often organised into familial clans such as the Julia. These clans often wielded a large amount of power and were huge influences through the Roman Kingdom into the Roman Republic. The political system was from an early date based upon competition within the ruling elite, the patricians. Senators in the Republic competed fiercely for public office, the most coveted of which was the post of consul. Two consuls were elected each year to head the government of the state, and would be assigned a consular army and an area in which to campaign. From Gaius Marius and Sulla onwards, control of the army began to be tied into the political ambitions of individuals, leading to the First Triumvirate of the 1st century BC and the resulting Caesar's civil war. The late Republic and Empire was increasingly plagued by usurpations led by or supported by the military, leading to the Crisis of the third century in the late empire.

== Roman Kingdom ==
Under the Etruscan king Servius Tullius, a person's social standing and wealth determined both their political and military role: following his reforms, a rich man would have had greater voting rights, and greater standing within the military, than a poor man. A further politicization of the military involved officers for a unit not belonging to and being drawn from the class of the military unit he commanded but being selected often through voting.

== Roman Republic ==
In the Republic, the tradition of social class determining military duty continued, despite structural changes – the rich equestrians continued to serve together in the equites for instance – but the lower ranks became less politicized and based upon a mix of social class, age and military experience rather than social class alone. For non-citizens, 25 years in the army was a guaranteed way of gaining citizenship for them and their family.

Despite these changes on the bottom rungs of the military, amongst the army's commanders a process began of politicizing military command. In the Republic, military service made a person of the equestrian class eligible for a wide range of profitable postings: military triumphs boosted a person's career, and military service became a pre-requirement for a number of political posts. Intended initially to ensure that all political leaders had shown dedication and duty serving in the military, the effect was to cause military experience to become of paramount importance to a Roman's political career, with the eventual consequence that armies would become tools for the political goals of their generals, rather than neutrally aligned forces of the state. At the highest level, two consuls were elected each year to head the government of the state and simultaneously were appointed the commanders-in-chief of the Roman army, and would be assigned a consular army and an area in which to campaign.

== From late Republic to mid-Roman Empire ==
In 100 BC, Lucius Appuleius Saturninus was tribune and advocated several social reforms, among which was a bill that gave colonial lands to war veterans, a suggestion that was radical and displeasing to the patrician Senate, which opposed the measures. Violence broke out and the Senate ordered Gaius Marius, as Consul for that year, to put down the revolt. Marius, although he was generally allied with the radicals, complied with the request and put down the revolt in the interest of public order. The political issue of land allocation for Rome's military veterans would return several times to haunt the state including 14 AD when an army in central Europe mutinied over the failure of the state to provide land plots for soldiers.

After the conclusion of the Social War, certain of Rome's eastern provinces became under threat of invasion and it was necessary to raise an army to counter the threat. The choice before the Senate was to put either Consul Marius or Consul Sulla in command of an army. There was already a fierce rivalry between the two, in part due to a competitive instinct amongst the two as successful generals, but more importantly distrust on Sulla's part that Marius held unhealthy ambitions. The Roman Republic was always on guard against any citizen gaining too much prominence, lest he seize power and restore Rome as a kingdom; thus, a series of checks and balances existed, such as consuls having to be re-elected annually. Marius had already served five consulships and enjoyed widespread popularity. The Senate made its decision and Sulla was given the job but a short time later the decision was reversed by the Assembly, and Marius placed in command. Already wary of Marius' prominence and previous five terms as consul, and (rightly) suspecting bribery in the securing of the position to command the army (Marius had promised to erase the debts of Publius Sulpicius Rufus), Sulla refused to acknowledge the validity of the Assembly's action.

Sulla left Rome and travelled to reach the army waiting in Nola, the army the Senate had asked him to lead against Mithridates. He urged the legions to defy the Assembly's orders and accept him as their rightful leader. Sulla was successful and the legions stoned the representatives from the Assembly when they arrived, defying the state's orders. Sulla then commanded six legions to march with him to Rome. This was a momentous event, and was unforeseen by Marius, as no Roman army had ever marched upon Rome (it was forbidden by law and ancient tradition). Marius fled with no great loss of life and Sulla later disbanded his legions and re-established consular government, but the military had been shown to be able to be used as a political tool of individuals. It was a pattern to be repeated more famously later by Julius Caesar.

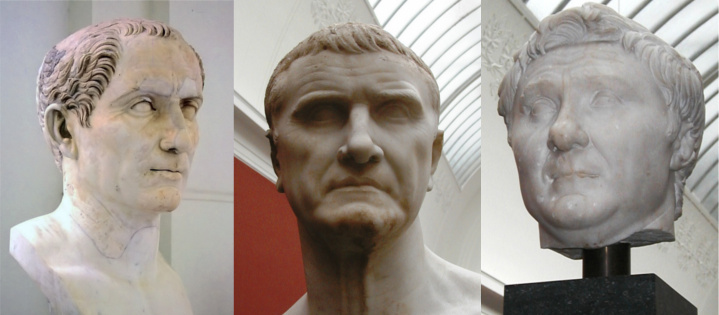
Caesar, Crassus, and Pompey, the members of the First Triumvirate

During the First Triumvirate of Caesar, Pompey and Crassus, each of the triumvires used military success to enhance their own political and public status. The incredibly wealthy consul Crassus, who had earlier displayed his wealth by entertaining the populace of Rome at a huge party with 10,000 tables, personally raised and funded six legions from his personal wealth. Whilst he did not at this time use them for marching on Rome in direct furtherance of his own career, his desperation to rival the military campaigns of Pompey that led to recognition in the public eye means that his motives are unlikely to have been entirely selfless. Rather, it was another step in the severance of the direct connection between state and troops that saw armies increasingly become tied to their generals' political careers.

When the Triumvirate collapsed, Caesar crossed the Rubicon river and marched his armies upon Rome itself. This turning of an army loyal to its general against the state had occurred before under Sulla, but the circumstances were different this time: Sulla felt at least partly justified in his march on Rome by the alleged and probably real corruption of the political system by Marius, and by Marius' own quest for primacy as a political figure against a political backdrop that sought to prevent any person becoming too prominent. Caesar, on the other hand, marched his army against Rome purely for his own purposes. It is true that the political maneuverings of Pompey, which made it possible for Caesar to be prosecuted on his return to Rome, pushed Caesar into marching on Rome, but the fact that almost the entire senate fled alongside Pompey shows that Caesar's actions were at least perceived to be an act against the state itself rather than the person of Pompey: Caesar's power base was built almost exclusively on the loyalty of the soldiers who had served under him campaigning several years. Unlike Sulla, Caesar also failed to revert power to the state when the threat of Pompey had been removed, not just keeping his position as de facto ruler of the state but, immediately on his return from defeating Pompey, naming his grand-nephew Gaius Octavius (Octavian) as the heir to his title, a wholly unconstitutional act. In everything but name, the army had placed the first emperor on the throne of Rome.

The years following the fall of the Republic were peaceful and relatively benign with the military not involving itself greatly in political affairs – such that the term Pax Augusta is often used – perhaps because the military was expending most of its energy in territorial expansion of the empire.

The Roman Senate and emperors were not blind to the possibility of rebellion by its troops as generals could gain the loyalty of his officers through a mixture of personal charisma, promises and simple bribes: once the general and officers had a unity of purpose the rigid discipline of the military meant that the troops would normally follow. Only later seemingly did the situation reverse and the soldiers began to dictate action to the officers and generals, raising generals to emperors even when the generals themselves were completely lacking such ambition or wishes. However, the state saw itself as relatively safe from such rebellions in the early imperial period. The reason for this safety from rebellion is that for a rebellion to be successful it was necessary for an usurper to gain control of a certain percentage of the army in order to stand some chance of success. Sulla and Caesar had managed such actions because the consular system of that period had concentrated in their hands a large proportion of the small number of armies in service of the state at the time. In the expanding empire, legions under generals were spread out across the extent of the Roman borders and it was not easy for one man to seize control of a great part of them, perhaps only commonly being in control of two or so legions. However, later larger-scale wars necessitated the concentration of greater military power in the hands of generals. There is evidence of emperors holding some members of generals' families as hostage to ensure their loyalty.

== Middle Roman Empire ==
By the mid Empire the military's involvement in politics had increased to the degree such that 193 AD saw no less than five emperors as armies heralded their generals as emperors or even, as after the death of Pertinax, murdered the Emperor and then sold the empire at auction to the highest bidder. Likewise, from 211 to the accession of Diocletian and the establishment of the Tetrarchy in 293, Rome saw 28 emperors of which only two had a natural death (from the plague). However, there were also 38 usurpers who raised revolts across the Empire. Successful usurpers were usually either provincial governors, commanders of a large grouping of Roman legions, or prefects of the Praetorian Guard, which had control of Rome, where the Imperial palace still lay. The problem of usurpation seems to have lain at least partially in the lack of a clear tradition enshrined in law and popular will of an agreed method of ensuring succession, and also in the maintenance of large standing armies. The former problem was evident from the very first emperor Augustus and meant that those claiming imperial power via various means, and whether they went on to become emperor or be denounced as usurpers, could all claim some form of legitimacy. The latter problem meant that there were always men remote from their duties and loyalties in Rome and in command or large armies marching under their discipline and command.

The usurpation mania of the 3rd century had profound effects in the military organization of the Empire. One of the most striking changes was the division and multiplication of the Roman provinces. The greater the manpower a provincial governor had under his command, the greater the temptation to make a bid to the throne. Thus, provinces were slowly divided into smaller units to avoid concentration of power and military capacity in the hands of one man.

== Late Roman Empire ==
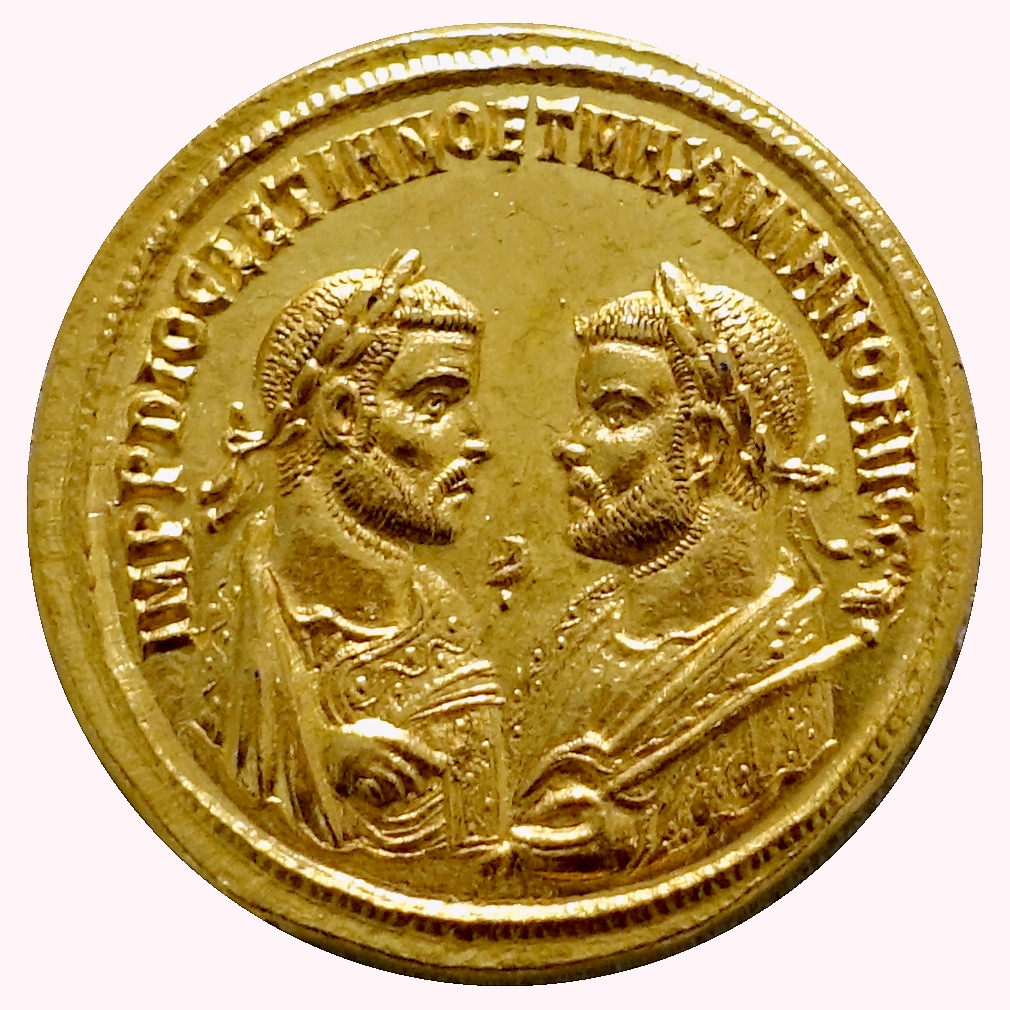
Diocletian and Maximian on a aureus (287 AD)

The beginning of the end of the Roman Empire did not start in a way that foreshadowed the downfall of a great power. The latter part of the Roman reign began when Diocletian (r. 284–305 AD) emerged. Diocletian was a strong and able leader but by creating smaller provinces, he effectively split the Empire into two parts: Eastern Roman Empire and Western Roman Empire. The maintenance of legions in a "strategic reserve" some distance behind the frontier and close to the emperors must also have been partially attributable to a need to preserve against rebellion by Roman border armies as much as against external invasion by an enemy. He also established the Tetrarchy in 293 AD by appointing Maximian, who played the role of a co-emperor, as well as Galerius and Constantius Chlorus, who were subordinate but powerful nonetheless. Constantius' son Constantine would reunite the halves 31 years later and founded a new capital at Constantinople in 330 AD.

Ultimately, the Empire itself was destroyed because of the eventual loyalty of its troops to their commanders over their state. In 476, Odoacer was appointed leader of the foederati troops of Rome, and deposed the emperor, proclaiming himself King of Italy.

== Political economy of the Roman military ==
There is evidence that starvation among Roman troops could induce them to mutiny. These mutinies, in turn, could then lead to political instability, including the assassination of the emperor himself.
