= Roman army of the late Republic =

Army of the Roman Republic, 1st century BC

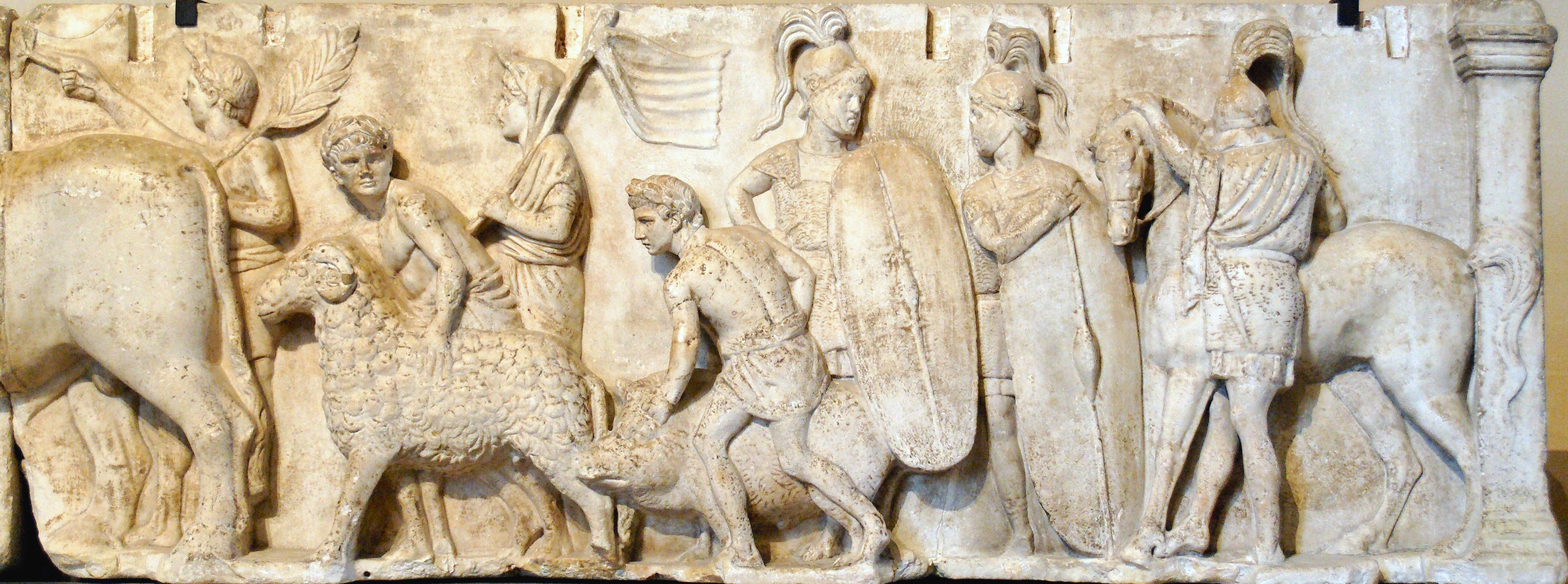
Detail from the Ahenobarbus relief showing (centre-right) two Roman foot-soldiers c. 122 BC. Note the Montefortino-style helmets with horsehair plume, chain mail cuirasses with shoulder reinforcement, oval shields with calfskin covers, gladius and pilum

The Roman army of the late Republic refers to the armed forces deployed by the late Roman Republic, from the beginning of the first century BC until the establishment of the Imperial Roman army by Augustus in 30 BC.

Shaped by major social, political, and economic change, the late Republic saw the transition from the Roman army of the mid-Republic, which was a temporary levy based solely on the conscription of Roman citizens, to the Imperial Roman army of the Principate, which was a standing, professional army based on the recruitment of volunteers.

Continuous expansion, wars, conflicts, and the acquisition of a growing, overseas territory led to an increasing degree of professionalism within the army. The late-Republic saw much of its action taking place within the Roman borders and between Roman commanders as they vied for control of the Republic. There was a significant intertwining of military and politics in the acquisition and maintenance of power. After the Social War, and following the establishment of the First Triumvirate by Julius Caesar, Licinius Crassus, and Pompeius Magnus, there grew an emphasis on the expansion of a united Republic toward regions such as Britain and Parthia. The effort to quell the invasions and revolts of non-Romans persisted throughout the period, from Marius’ battles with the wandering Germans in Italy to Caesar's campaign in Gaul.

After the completion of the Social War in 88 BC, Roman citizenship was granted to all its Italian allies (the socii) south of the Po River. The alae were abolished, and the socii were from now on recruited directly into uniformly organized and equipped legions. The non-Italian allies that had long fought for Rome (e.g., Gallic and Numidian cavalry) continued to serve alongside the legions but remained irregular units under their own leaders.

For reasons that remain uncertain to this day, the structure of the Roman army changed dramatically during the late Republic. The maniple, which had been the standard unit throughout the mid-Republic, was replaced by the cohort as the new standard tactical unit of the legions, while the Roman citizen cavalry (equites) and light infantry (velites) disappeared from the battlefield. Traditionally, many of these changes have been attributed to the reforms of Gaius Marius (see Marian reforms), but some scholars argue that they may have happened far more gradually.

== Main sources ==
The main sources for the army's organization and practices in this period are the publications De Bello Gallico and De Bello Civilli, begun by the Roman general Julius Caesar and finished by his subordinates.

== Conflicts and expansion ==
During the late Republic, Rome was in a state of almost continuous warfare and civil war. Ambitious commanders, driven by a desire to distinguish themselves from their contemporaries, led massive campaigns to expand the empire's borders far beyond the region of Italy. In the “most intensive period of conquest in Rome's history,” Rome dramatically increased in size by adding large territories in Gaul, North Africa, Asia Minor, Cyprus, Crete, and the Levant to its territory. The frequency of war, the prolonged duration of the campaigns, and the growing demand for garrisons resulted in the legions to develop a much more permanent and professional character. As the length of military service increased, the legionaries began to view the army not just as an interruption of normal life, but as a career in itself.

=== Campaign history: military in politics ===
==== Jugurthine War ====
After receiving permission from the Plebeian Council to command the army in 107 BC, Gaius Marius marched through Numidia to take the town of Capsa whose entire population was either killed or sold into slavery. This action was later criticized as “against the law of war” by Roman historian Sallust. Marius then swiftly assured victory after marching 600 miles to capture the Jugurthine Royal Treasury. The campaign displayed the effectiveness of the proletarian army in battle.

==== Conflict with wandering Germanic tribes ====
In 105 BC, two Roman armies were defeated by the Cimbri and Teutones in the Battle of Arausio. These forces were led by Servilius Caepio of a firmly ingrained Roman heritage and Mallius Maximus from a newer, aspiring family. The defeat is credited to a lack of coordination due to strife between them as Caepio refused to work alongside someone not of noble blood.

The constant fear of Germanic invasion allowed the Populist faction a foothold to have Gaius Marius reelected in 104, 103, and 102 BC. Marius showcased his army's capability once again, first massacring 90,000 of the 100,000 Teutones soldiers, which included women and children, implementing a well-coordinated rear ambush tactic. He subsequently overpowered the Cimbri at Vercellae in what is now Vercelli, Italy. Following these battles, Marius eradicated the equites and thus the light cavalry which doubled as a political attack against the aristocratic class.

Since proletarians had no land to return to, Marius, now beginning his 6th consulship, joined his men in the Forum to battle the Senate who refused to provide them with land. This exemplifies the growing trend of applying military force to obtain a political resolution.

==== Social War ====
The Social War opened in 91 BC when Italians began to revolt because the Senate would not grant them Roman citizenship even though they showed loyalty in fighting for Rome in the past. The revolt was headed by the Marsi and Samnites who established a capital, senate, and two commanders at Corfinium which was renamed Italia. Some Italians remained on Rome's side including the Etruscans, Umbrians, Campanians, Greeks, and Latins. The Roman force consisted of 150,000 men against 100,000, but the rebellion was extinguished when, in 89 BC, Rome presented a citizenship offer to all Italians that surrendered.

==== Civil Wars ====
At the completion of the Social War in 89 BC, Lucius Cornelius Sulla Felix marched on Rome with six legions, who devoted their loyalty solely to him, as a means of coercing the Plebeian Council to grant him authority to fight King Mithridates of Pontus who invaded the Roman province of Asia. This sparked factional fighting and the murders of important Romans such as Quintus Pompeius Rufus. Lucius Cornelius Cinna and Gaius Marius teamed up to use their armies to sack and loot Rome and declare themselves co-consuls after starving it out. It would be Marius’ seventh and final term. In 83 BC, following his capture of Athens from Mithridates, Sulla returned to Rome, joined his army of 35,000 veterans with three legions raised by the young Pompey to defeat a lone consul's 100,000 newly recruited.

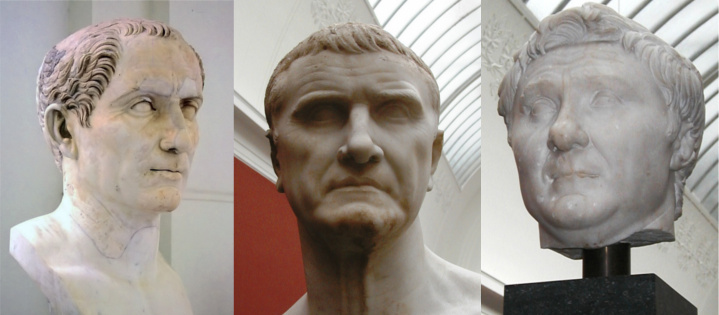
Caesar, Crassus, and Pompey, the members of the First Triumvirate

The First Triumvirate in 60 BC consisted of Pompey, Marcus Licinius Crassus, and Julius Caesar; the latter was granted command in Cisalpine Gaul, Illyricum, and Transalpine Gaul as a result of some recent successes: commanding at a victorious siege of Mytilene in 80 BC to receive a civic crown, defeating pirates in naval warfare, commanding in the Pontic War of 74, and subduing Spanish tribes in 61. Caesar called upon his forces to threaten the Senate into providing land for Pompey's veterans.

Annexations achieved by Caesar (although he cunningly called them alliances) include lands of many Gallic tribes such as the Aedui, Belgic tribes like the Nervii, and Germanic tribes including the Usipetes and Tencteri. Even though he characteristically drove his men to their limits in these battles, those legions would grow intensely loyal to him which would become very important in the near future.

As Caesar's legal command over his 13 legions was running out, he famously crossed the Rubicon River with just one legion, purportedly stating alea iacta est ("the die is cast"). He defeated the larger Pompeian armies through the experience of his men and clever use of strategy, even employing the pilum as a bayonet to combat Pompey's 7–1 cavalry advantage.

Caesar's assassination led to the creation of the Second Triumvirate of Octavian (to become known as Augustus), Mark Antony, and Marcus Aemilius Lepidus in 43 BC. Exemplifying the mobility of loyalty in the army of this period, Octavian was able to raise legions without legal command as a result of his Caesarian connection, two of which had defected from Antony. The Triumvirate was short lived and inner strife led to further civil war. Thanks to the military prowess of his general Agrippa, Octavian was able to gain control of the West's entire army of 45 legions and navy of 500–600 ships. Even though the Roman military power concentrated on heavy infantry, the importance of naval warfare was displayed in the final Battle of Actium, where Octavian achieved total victory. He then acted to consolidate the military in preparation to transition the Roman government to the Principate.

== Background: The Polybian army ==
The organization of the army of the mid-republic (also known as the "Polybian" or Manipular army) was described by the Greek historian Polybius in the mid-second century BC The basic military unit of the Polybian army was the maniple, which numbered about 120 men, and was subdivided into two centuries of 60 men. The standard legion contained thirty maniples organized into three distinct lines, and consisted of about 4,200 infantrymen and 300 Roman citizen cavalrymen (equites). The actual size of the legions, however, often depended on the particular situation, and sources mention that in times of need legions could number between 5,000 and 6,000 men.

Based on their property and age, the infantrymen were divided into four specific groups, and were organized and equipped according to that particular group. The first group, which formed the first line of the Polybian legion, was that of the hastati. These men were recruited from the younger men eligible for service and were probably in their late teens or early 20s. The second line was formed by the principes, who were drawn from men in their later 20s or early 30s, and the last line was made up by the triarii, who were the oldest and (supposedly) most experienced men in the army. While there were normally 1,200 hastati and 1,200 principes in every legion, the triarii numbered just 600. The poorest and youngest of the citizens fought in the legions as light infantry (velites), of which there were usually 1,200 in each legion.

Beside the troops levied from the eligible Roman population served the troops provided by Rome's allies. These troops, primarily recruited from Rome's allies on the Italian peninsula (or the socii), were organized in so-called alae (ala singular) or 'wing' (referring to their location on the flanks of the Roman legions).

=== Marian reforms ===
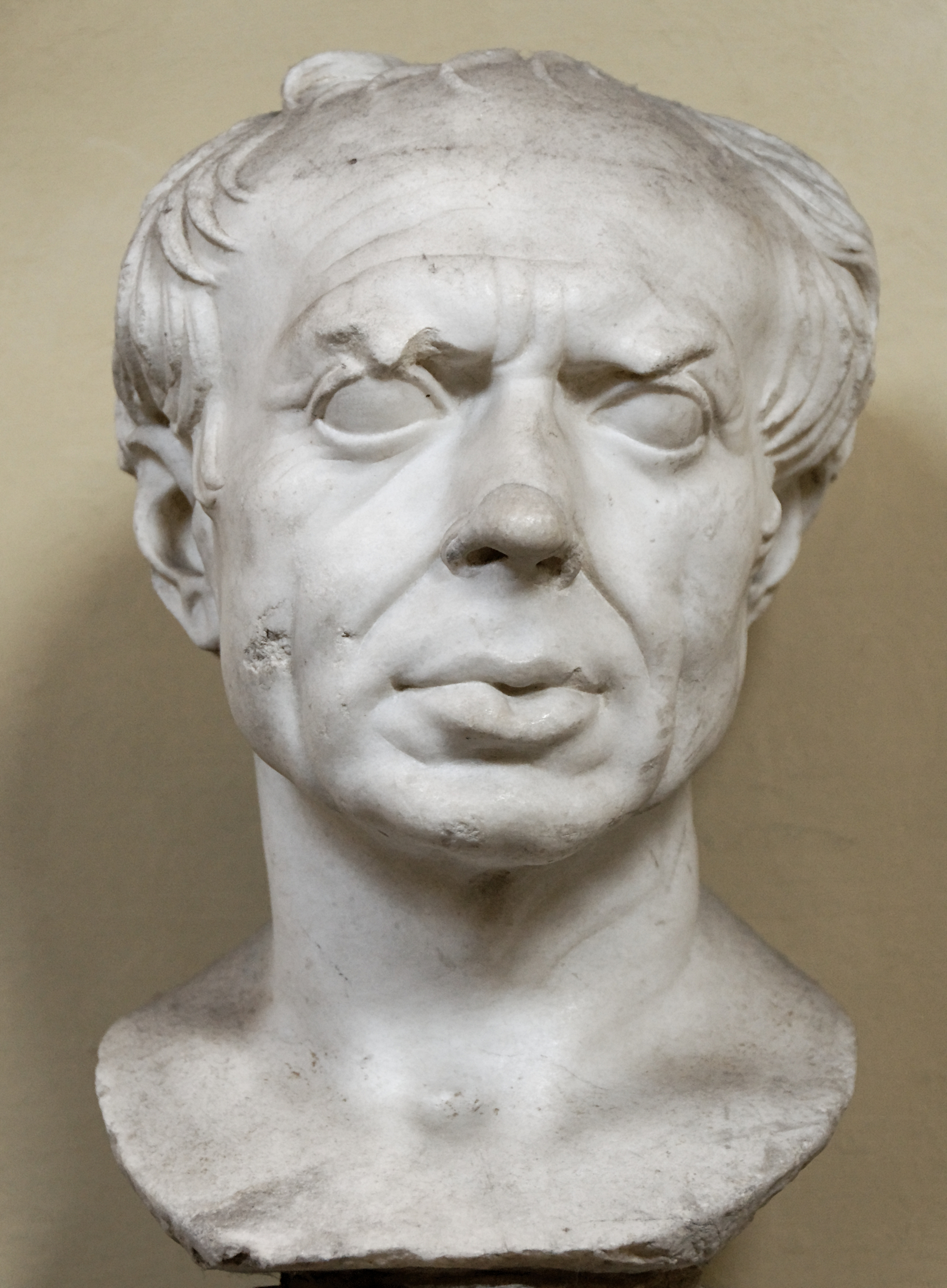
A bust said to depict Gaius Marius, noted for his seven consulships and putative reforms of the Roman army

The Marian reforms were putative changes to the composition and operation of the Roman army during the late Roman Republic usually attributed to Gaius Marius (a general who was consul in 107, 104–100, and 86 BC). The most important of these concerned the altering of the socio-economic background of the soldiery. Other changes were supposed to have included the introduction of the cohort; the institution of a single form of heavy infantry with uniform equipment; the universal adoption of the eagle standard; and the abolition of the citizen cavalry. It was commonly believed that Marius changed the soldiers' socio-economic background by allowing citizens without property to join the Roman army, a process called "proletarianisation". This was thought to have created a semi-professional class of soldiers motivated by land grants; these soldiers in turn became clients of their generals, who then used them to overthrow the republic.

Belief in a comprehensive scheme of reforms under Marius emerged in 1840s German scholarship, which posited that any changes in the Roman army between the times of Polybius and Marius were attributable to a single reform event. This belief was spread relatively uncritically and was accepted as largely proven by the 1850s and through much of the 20th century. There is, however, little ancient evidence for any permanent or significant change to recruitment practice in Marius' time. The occurrence of such a comprehensive reform led by Marius is no longer widely accepted by specialists; 21st-century scholars have called the reforms a "construct of modern scholarship".

Other reforms to the army's operations and equipment, said to have been implemented by Marius, are also largely rejected by scholars. Few of them have any basis in the ancient and archaeological evidence. Others are wrongly dated or misattributed. Changes in the Roman army of the late republic did occur, but appear to have happened later than at the end of the 2nd century BC. Rather, these shifts were during the Social War and following civil wars, and emerged from circumstance rather than a reformist Marian vision.

== Army structure and organization ==
=== Legionary infantry ===
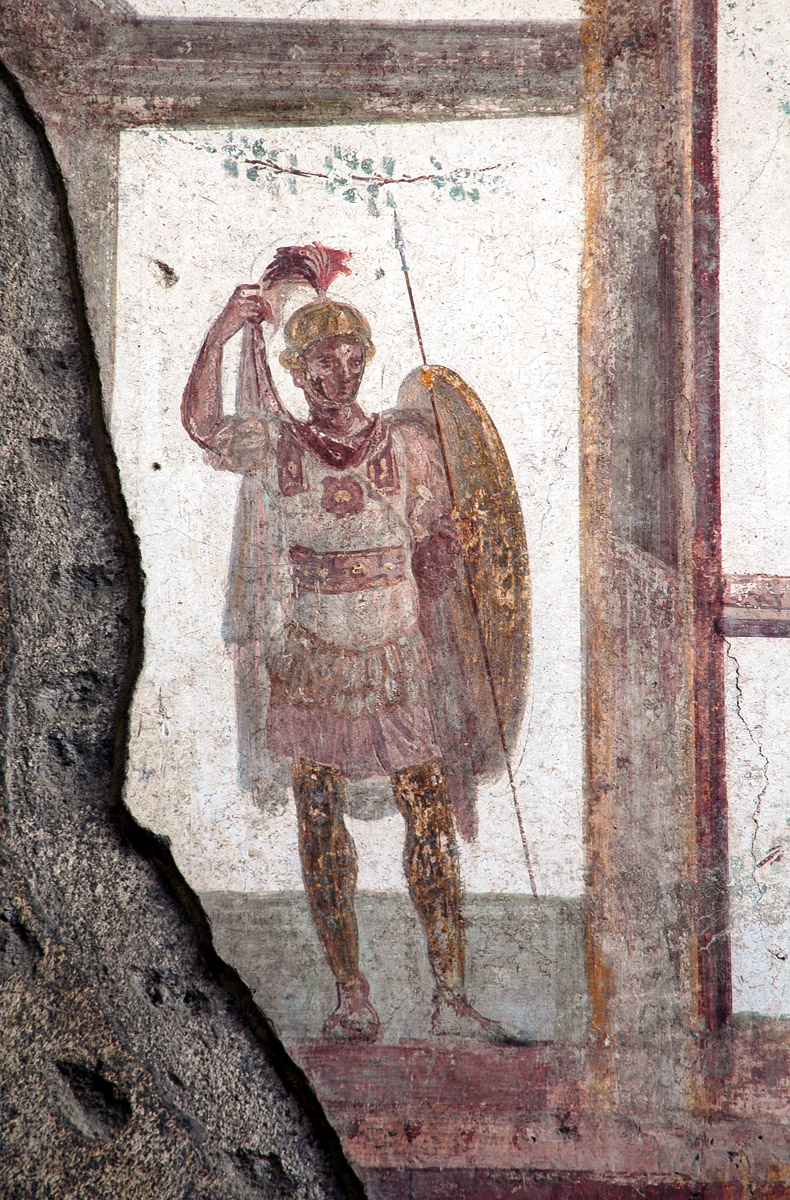
A Roman soldier depicted in a fresco in Pompeii, c. 80—20 BC

By the first decades of the 1st century, the cohort had replaced the maniple as the standard tactical unit of the legions. The three lines of the manipular legion were combined to form the cohort, which generally numbered about 480 to 500 men. Maniples and centuriae continued to be used to as military and administrative subdivisions for the cohort. There were six centuriae in a cohort, which were now all 80-men strong. The legion was now composed of ten cohorts rather than thirty maniples, and numbered an average of about 5,000 men. The legionaries no longer needed to provide their own equipment and were now all equipped and organized as heavy infantry with pilum and gladius.

It is unclear when or for what reasons the cohort became the basic unit. Sources such as Polybius and Livy suggest that cohorts existed as a military unit well before the late Republic and that cohorts had been used alongside maniples in the mid-Republic. Traditionally, historians have attributed the standardization of the cohort to Gaius Marius who, among his other reforms (see Marian reforms), may have increased the size of the basic unit as a response to the Germanic and Celtic concentrated and dispersed way of fighting. Other historians believe that the cohort may have gradually developed as the standard unit and that Marius merely continued a trend that was already in progress.

Nevertheless, it is clear that the cohort provided several advantages over the manipular organization. The cohort structure simplified the use of commands, since orders only had to be conveyed to ten units instead of thirty. It also enabled much more flexibility through independent and rapid detached operations. The cohort could vary in size depending on the time and place. For example, at the Battle of Pharsalus in 48 BC Pompey's cohorts numbered 409 men while Caesar's cohorts contained just 275 legionaries.

Following the conclusion of the Social War, soldiers in the Roman army began to acquire a specialized expertise alongside their regular legionary duty. These roles included engineers, doctors, and artillerymen who operated the ballistae and catapults. During the Republic, the required length of service included six consecutive years followed by a total of ten more years. Once Augustus came to power, this was increased to twenty total years.

Even though they identified as soldiers of Rome, legionaries of the late Republic increasingly shifted their true loyalty to a specific general because of the length of each campaign and the respect they gained for the general's military prowess. As the civil wars came to a close, there were a total of 28 Roman legions. Some assigned numbers were repeated since legionary allegiances became scattered among generals when military overcame politics. Thus, repetitions were allocated a name as well, such as Legio III Augusta and Legio III Gallica.

The consuls were commanders in chief of the army as a whole. In provinces, the governor would be given command of the army units within his territory. Beneath him were the legionary legates, a laticlavian tribune who was a senatorial officer working for 1–2 years toward becoming a senator at the age of 25, five angusticlavian tribunes, and lastly, equestrians who supported the legate and were a class below the senators in society.

Under Julius Caesar, officers all came from aristocratic families that contained senators of the highest standings. Common soldiers, however, whether Roman or not, could rise through the ranks if they displayed outstanding ability and loyalty. Caesar also raised each legionary's salary to 900 sesterces a year and granted Roman citizenship to soldiers raised in Gaul for their effort in his war against Pompey.

=== Velites ===
The light-armed troops, the velites, disappeared from the records after Sallust's account of Metellus’ campaign in 109–108 BC. Their elimination has traditionally been linked to Marius, to whom several other changes in organization and equipment have also been ascribed; however, no concrete proof of such a reform has ever been found. This led some historians to suggest that the lowering of the property qualifications may have been the cause behind their disappearance. 21st century scholars question if there exists enough evidence to show that property qualifications were even reduced. If they were, the citizens who originally made up the velites – the poorest and youngest of the men eligible for service – then could join the legions as legionaries instead. Because the legionaries were associated with higher pay and prestige, it is possible that the velites weren't abolished, but rather disappeared gradually as their recruitment declined.

=== Cavalry ===
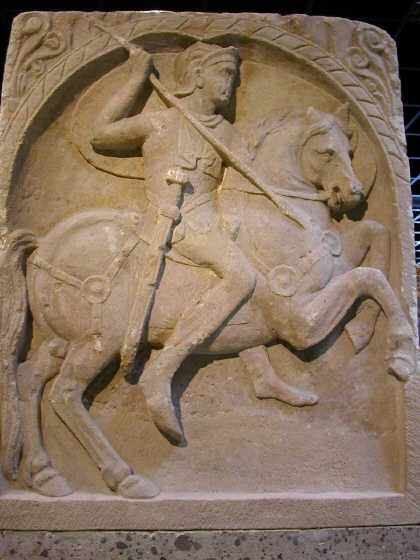
Headstone of a cavalryman from 1st century AD. Romano-Germanic Museum, Cologne, Germany

As with the velites, the Roman and Italian allied cavalry (the equites) disappeared as a fighting force in the beginning of the late Republic. From this period until the Principate, the Romans relied on non-Roman mercenaries and auxiliary units to provide its cavalry during wars and campaigns. Previous generations of scholars have ascribed the elimination of the citizen cavalry to Marius’ reforms. The inferiority of Roman cavalry and their ineffectiveness against enemy cavalry may have motivated Marius to disband the Roman citizen cavalry altogether. There is, however, no concrete evidence of any such reform, and it is arguable whether Roman cavalry truly was ineffective.

It has also been suggested that the desperate need for manpower during the Social War and the social-political changes that followed may have been responsible for their disappearance. The Social War strained the Roman manpower resources as its allies and clients, who had supplied soldiers to Rome in the past, revolted against them. To compensate for the soldiers it had lost, Rome may have been forced to recruit its legionaries from the equites while the auxiliaries provided for Rome's cavalry (only Roman citizens could become legionaries). With the granting of citizenship to all Italian communities and the growing significance of wealth and income to status, cavalry service, which had been used to climb the ranks of society in the past, may have decreased in importance all together as it became associated with foreigners.

=== Auxiliaries ===
The disappearance of the Roman cavalry and light infantry was paralleled by the increasing use of Auxilia. The use of non-Roman and non-Italian troops had been a common practice in the mid-Republic, but significantly increased in scale during the late Republic. While the legionaries were now recruited from the Italian communities south of the Po River, Rome had to rely on its non-Roman allies and clients to provide cavalry and light infantry. Despite problems with loyalty and desertion, this practice may have offered many benefits as some possessed over specialized skills or native traditions that the Romans lacked. Auxiliary units such as the Numidians, Spanish, and Gauls were famed by the Romans for the strength of their cavalry. Numidian javelineers, Cretan archers, and Balearic slingers were notorious for their effectiveness as light infantry. In most circumstances, these units were only raised for specific campaigns and disbanded as soon as their services were no longer required.

== Military strategy ==
After the development of the cohort, once in formation, the general would give a speech of encouragement and then give the signal to attack. Intimidation was a tactic commonly used by the Romans; soldiers would even litter the battlefield with severed body parts beforehand to frighten the enemy. The Roman strategy was to make battles as short as possible. To do so, they would begin by hurling their pila, and then uniformly charge to rout the enemy and slaughter them. This action is where the cavalry was most effective; otherwise, it was protecting the flanks and rear. Outside battle, the cavalry was mostly employed to obstruct enemy supply lines and scout areas.

The army of Julius Caesar focused on swift movements (celeritas) over spending time on full preparations. His approach to strategy is known to be one of great daring and risk. He subjected his men to dangerous winter marches and relied heavily on the crafting skill of Romans in quickly building siege weapons and fortifications. He even split his army in two while fighting Gallic tribes. His success in carrying out these unusual tactics is why he is credited with exceptional cunning. During the war with Pompey, Caesar depended heavily on the experience of his soldiers in the face of larger numbers.

== Equipment ==
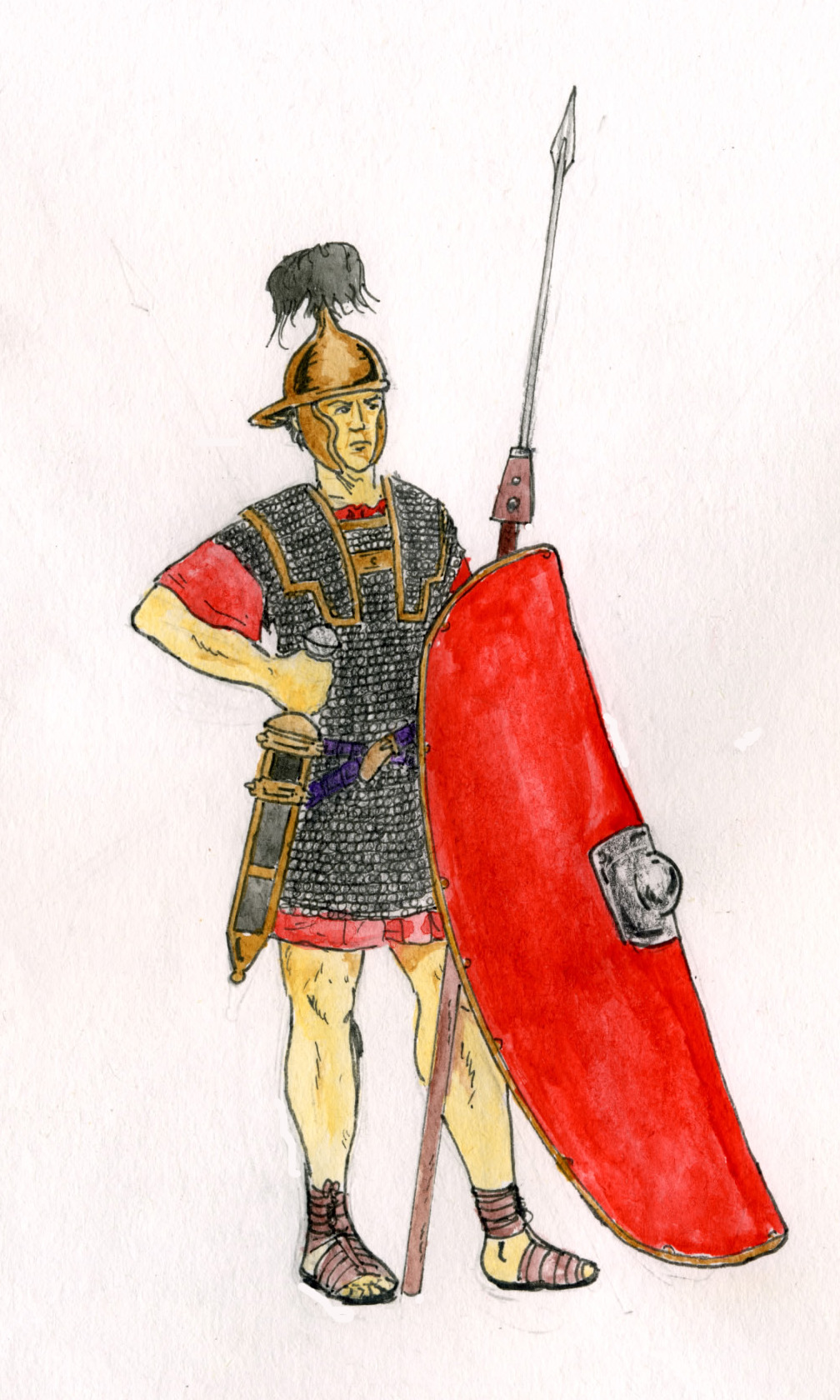
Illustration of a late Republican legionary, equipped with pilum, gladius, scutum, lorica hamata and a Montefortino helmet.

While in the mid-Republic legionaries had to provide their own equipment and were equipped according to military unit and status, in the late Republic equipment was issued by the state and all legionaries were equipped in a similar fashion.

=== Weapons ===
Legionaries in the late Republican army were all armed with the pilum and the gladius. The pilum was a short-range javelin with an effective range of about 15 meters (50 ft), but could also be used as a spear in situations where an enemy had to be held back. It was hurled at the enemy formations right before the charge and this hail of javelins was intended to break the force of the enemy charge as well as demoralize the enemy by inflicting casualties and hindering shield use. The pilum in the late Republic consisted of a pyramidal iron head atop a 60–90 centimetre long soft iron shank, which was attached to a wooden shaft. Once the pilum struck a hard surface, the unhardened iron shank would buckle under the weight of the shaft; this prevented the enemy from throwing it back. The pilum's narrow point, long shank, and heavy weight meant that a hit on an enemy shield would often pierce through and strike the defender. Even if the opponent was not struck, the pilum's weight would then render the shield useless to its owner and the barbed head made it difficult to withdraw.

The gladius, or the "Iberian sword", continued to be the primary weapon of the late Republican legionary. With its exceptionally long point and sharp, double edges, the gladius was used both as a slashing and stabbing weapon. The manufacturing and repair-work for legionary weapons and armor was completed through private companies known as publicans.

=== Body armor ===
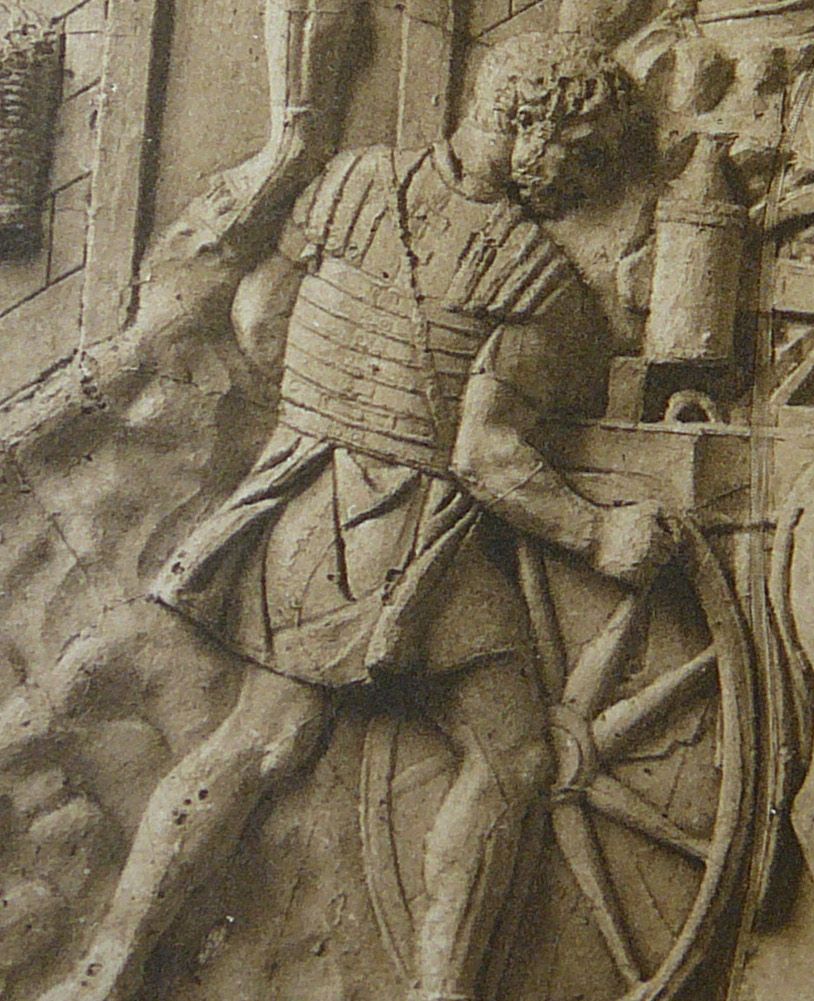
Legionary wearing a lorica segmentata

Chain-mail armour (lorica hamata) was the standard type of body protection used by legionaries during the late Republican period. It was generally composed of iron rings that measured an average of 1 mm in thickness and 7 mm in diameter. Although heavy – it could weigh about 10–15 kg (22–23 lb.) – mail armour was relatively flexible and comfortable, and offered a fair amount of protection. The famous segmented armor (lorica segmentata) often associated with the Romans probably wasn't used until the Imperial period.

=== Helmets ===
Helmets of the Montefortino and the Coolus types were the most commonly used helmets in the late Republic. Both types were originally derived from Gallic designs and featured cheek and neck guards that offered protection to the face and head without obstructing the soldier's hearing and vision. The Montefortino helmet, the oldest of the two types, had been in use since at least the third century BC until it was gradually replaced by the Coolus helmet, which made its entrance in the beginning of the first century BC. The Coolus helmet featured wider cheek and neck guards than the Montefortino type, and generally had a reinforcing peak to the front to protect its user against blows from that direction. Although not confirmed by any archaeological evidence, it is generally believed that the centurions distinguished themselves from legionaries by a wide transverse crest. The legionaries, likewise, often mounted their helmets with plumes and crests, which were attached to a knob located on top of the helmet.

=== Shields ===
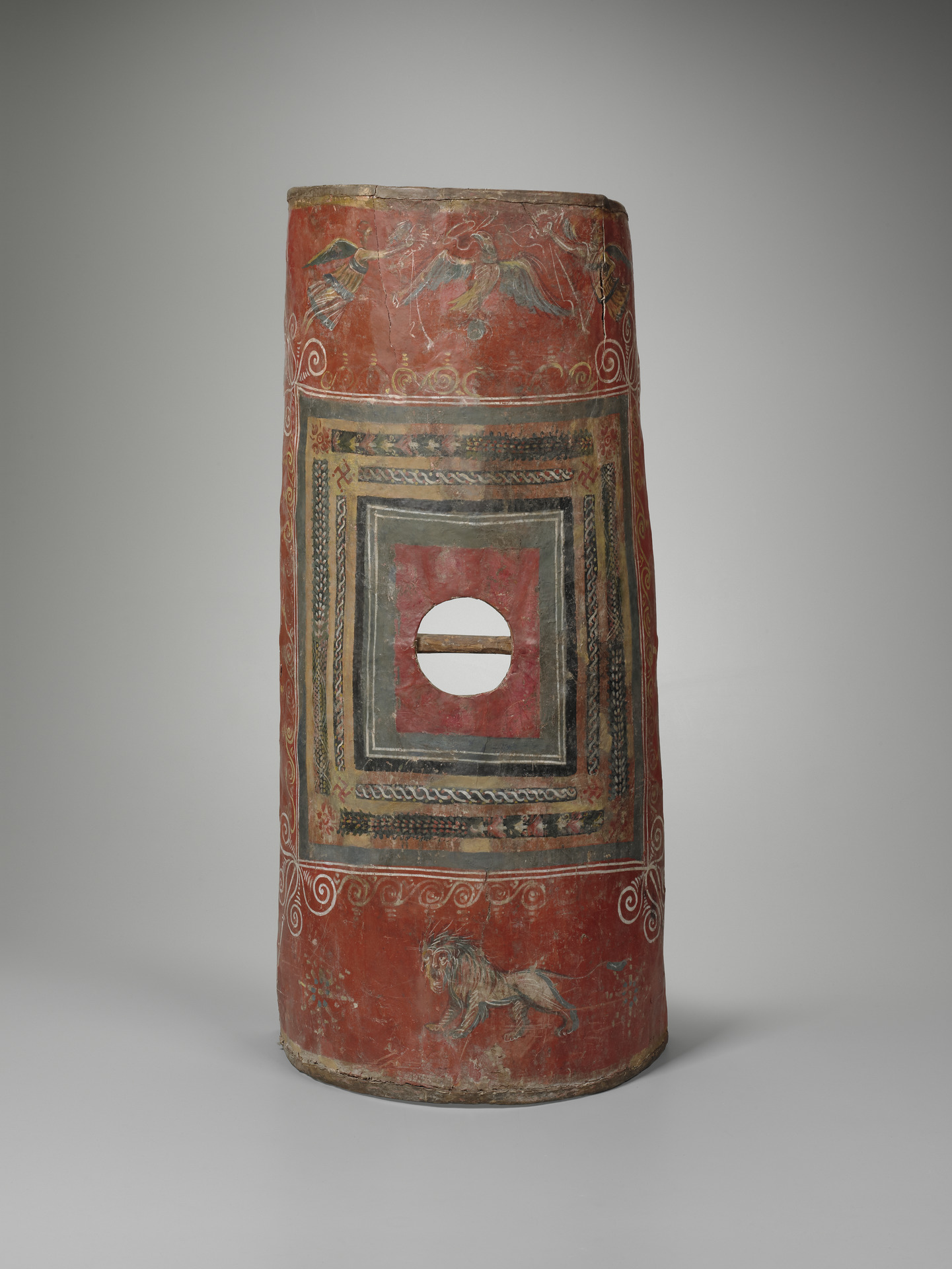
A scutum

The legionaries carried a long and oval-shaped shield (the scutum) that curved both at the tops and sides. It usually consisted of two or three glued together layers of wood, with a canvas and hide cover and an iron or copper alloy boss at the center. The purpose of the scutum was both to deflect attacks as well as to bash against the opponent's shield or body to create an opening in the formation.

== Military training ==
Soldiers were trained to display agility, technique, and endurance, but most of all courage and confidence in their ability to fight aggressively while maintaining the formation. These qualities and abilities are what the Romans believed would bring them victory over every enemy. Although soldiers received organized instruction upon enlisting, training essentially lasted for their entire career. A large emphasis was always placed on maintaining the ranks, not fleeing, not breaking away to attack on impulse, and keeping enough space between men so as not to inhibit range of motion. Sword-to-sword combat was held above all else in the Roman military culture. Soldiers were expected to fight for honor and glory for themselves and Rome, and as such were paid more of a maintenance than a salary.

== Discipline and punishment ==
The Romans saw the maintenance of discipline as an important means to ensure military success. Sources from the period sketch a harsh image of the punishments administered in the Roman army. Measures such as clubbing, flogging, stoning, crucifixion, and public embarrassment are mentioned among the types of punishment in sources such as Polybius' Histories. Beatings to death with a wooden club (fustuarium) were administered to any soldier who was caught stealing from the camp, gave false witness, left his post, or discarded his armor or some other piece of equipment. Legionaries who fled during the battle could risk being crucified or thrown in an arena with wild beasts. Acting on the belief of collective responsibility, it was possible in the Roman army to punish a group or unit as a whole for the acts it had committed. In a measure known as decimatio, one-tenth of a group or unit found guilty of offenses such as desertion or cowardice was randomly chosen by lot and executed. The remaining men of the group could have been ordered to sleep outside the camp defenses, and were given rations of barley instead of wheat. This was perceived as deeply humiliating by the soldiers, for barley was considered the food of their livestock.

In the late Republic, it was the commanding general who exercised ultimate disciplinary and judicial authority within the army. Because there were no specific laws that bounded his decision-making, the general was, in essence, free to maintain discipline and administer punishment in any way he saw fit. However, in reality penalties were customary and specific acts were generally met with specific punishments. In ordinary, daily circumstances, the punishment of soldiers was left to a tribunal of military tribunes. The military tribunes tried the suspect(s) and were responsible for deciding on the appropriate punishment. For the allied auxiliary troops, punishment was administered by their prefects. The fate of higher-ranked officers was decided by the commanding general. While centuries and junior officers exercised disciplinary authority and thus were responsible for the maintenance of discipline of the smaller unit-scale, they were not authorized to decide on the punishment of their subordinates.

== Social impact of military service ==
Soldiers came to view themselves as a class superior to average citizens, and exhibited corresponding behavior. This led to an overarching sense of fear and antipathy whenever Roman citizens encountered Roman legionaries.

Victories were celebrated in what was known as a triumph, a large, extravagant, parade-like procession through the streets of Rome. During these events, spoils of war would be handed out to soldiers and citizens.

== See also ==
- Structural history of the Roman military
- Campaign history of the Roman military
