= Accensi =

Roman light infantry and civil servants

The term accensi (sg.: accensus) is applied to two different groups. Originally, the accensi were light infantry in the armies of the early Roman Republic. They were the poorest men in the legion, and could not afford much equipment. They did not wear armour or carry shields, and their usual position was part of the third battle line. They fought in a loose formation, supporting the heavier troops. They were eventually phased out by the time of Second Punic War. In the later Roman Republic the term was used for civil servants who assisted the elected magistrates, particularly in the courts, where they acted as ushers and clerks.

== Infantry ==
=== History and deployment ===
Accensi appear to have evolved from the old fifth class of the army under the Etruscan kings when it was reformed by Marcus Furius Camillus. The fifth class was made up of the poorest soldiers in the legion who were equipped with slings and perhaps a small shield. They acted as skirmishers, screening their own formations and disrupting the enemy. It is likely that engagements with the Samnites and a crushing defeat at the hands of the Gauls taught the Romans the importance of flexibility and the inadequacy of the phalanx on the rough, hilly ground of central Italy.

==== Camillan system ====
A depiction of a Roman formation c. 340 BC. Units of hastati form the front of the formation, backed up by lines of principes, triarii and rorarii. The accensi form the rearmost units.

In the early Camillan system of organisation of the 3rd and 4th centuries BC, men were sorted into classes according to wealth, the accensi being the poorest. Accensi were armed with slings which they used to hurl stones at enemy formations. They fought as skirmishers, wearing only a tunic and sometimes carrying a small round shield.

In this type of legion, the 900 accensi formed 15 maniples, military units of 60 men each, which were in turn part of 15 ordines, larger units made up of a maniple of triarii, a maniple of rorarii and a maniple of accensi. The accensi stood in the last line of the legion, behind the front line of hastati, the second line of principes, the third of triarii and the fourth of rorarii. In a pitched battle, the leves, javelin armed skirmishers who were attached to maniples of hastati, would form up at the front of the legion and harass the enemy with javelin fire and cover the advance of the hastati, spear armed infantry. If the hastati failed to break the enemy, they would fall back and let the principes, heavier and more experienced infantry, take over. If the principes did not break them, they would retire behind the triarii, who would then engage the enemy in turn—hence the expression rem ad Triarios redisse, "it has come to the triarii"—signalling an act of desperation. The equites, cavalrymen, were used as flankers and to pursue routing enemies. The rorarii, the poorer reserve soldiers, and accensi, the least dependable troops armed with slings, would be used in a support role, providing mass and supporting wavering areas of the line.

==== Polybian system ====
By the time of the later Polybian system of the 2nd century BC, accensi had been phased out. Velites, light skirmishers, would now fulfill skirmishing duties and troops that would usually have gone into the accensi would now be excluded from service.

== Civil servants ==
As with the lictors, Accensi were usually professional civil servants, providing assistance to the elected magistrates during their term in office. In the courts, they summoned witnesses, kept track of time, and helped keep order. Outside of the courts, they escorted the magistrate and acted as heralds. They also helped in writing edicts and laws. It is also possible they were messengers and orderlies. The Accensi Velati were non military participants of military campaigns. They probably assisted clerks, accountants, supply officials, and aides. They also assisted religious affairs especially the Feriae Latinae, formed a collegium dedicated to managing the streets, and had a centuriate assembly dedicated to them.

== See also ==
- Structural history of the Roman military
- Roman infantry tactics
- List of Roman army unit types
