= Principes =

Class of soldier in the early Roman Republic

Principes (sg.: princeps) were spearmen, and later swordsmen, in the armies of the early Roman Republic. They were men in the prime of their lives who were fairly wealthy, and could afford decent equipment. They were the heavier infantry of the legion who carried large shields and wore good quality armor.

Their usual position was the second battle line. They fought in a quincunx formation, supported by light troops. They were eventually disbanded after the so-called "Marian reforms" of the late Roman Republic.

== History and deployment ==
According to Pat Southern, principes appear to have been born from remnants of the old second class of the army under the Etruscan kings when it was reformed by Marcus Furius Camillus. The second class stood in some of the first few ranks of a very large phalanx and were equipped in a similar manner to principes. They would support the heavier first class in the front ranks. It is probable that engagements with the Samnites and a crushing defeat at the hands of the Gallic warlord Brennus, who both used many smaller military units rather than a few very large ones, taught the Romans the importance of flexibility and the inadequacy of the phalanx on the rough, hilly ground of central Italy.

=== Fourth and third centuries BC ===
In the late 4th and early 3rd centuries BC, men were sorted into classes based on wealth, the principes being the wealthiest after the triarii. Principes were armed with a pilum, which is a throwing spear, and a sword, which was used after the spear had been thrown. They fought in a quincunx formation, usually carrying scuta, large rectangular shields, and bronze helmets, often with a number of feathers fixed onto the top to increase stature. They wore heavier armour types, the most common form being chainmail, which offered a good degree of protection without hindering movement.

According to Livy, in this type of legion, the 900 principes formed 15 maniples, military units of 60 men each. The principes stood in the second battle line, behind hastati in the first line, and in front of the triarii in the third. In a pitched battle, the leves, javelin-armed light infantry, would form up at the front of the legion and harass the enemy with javelin fire to cover the advance of the hastati (light spearmen).

If the hastati failed to break the enemy during their engagement, they would fall back and let the heavier principes take over. If the principes could not break through, they would retire behind the heavy triarii spearmen who would then engage the enemy in turn. The equites, cavalrymen, were used as flankers and to pursue routing enemies. The rorarii and accensi in the final battle line were some of the least dependable troops, and were used in a support role, providing mass and reinforcing wavering areas of the line.

=== Polybian system ===
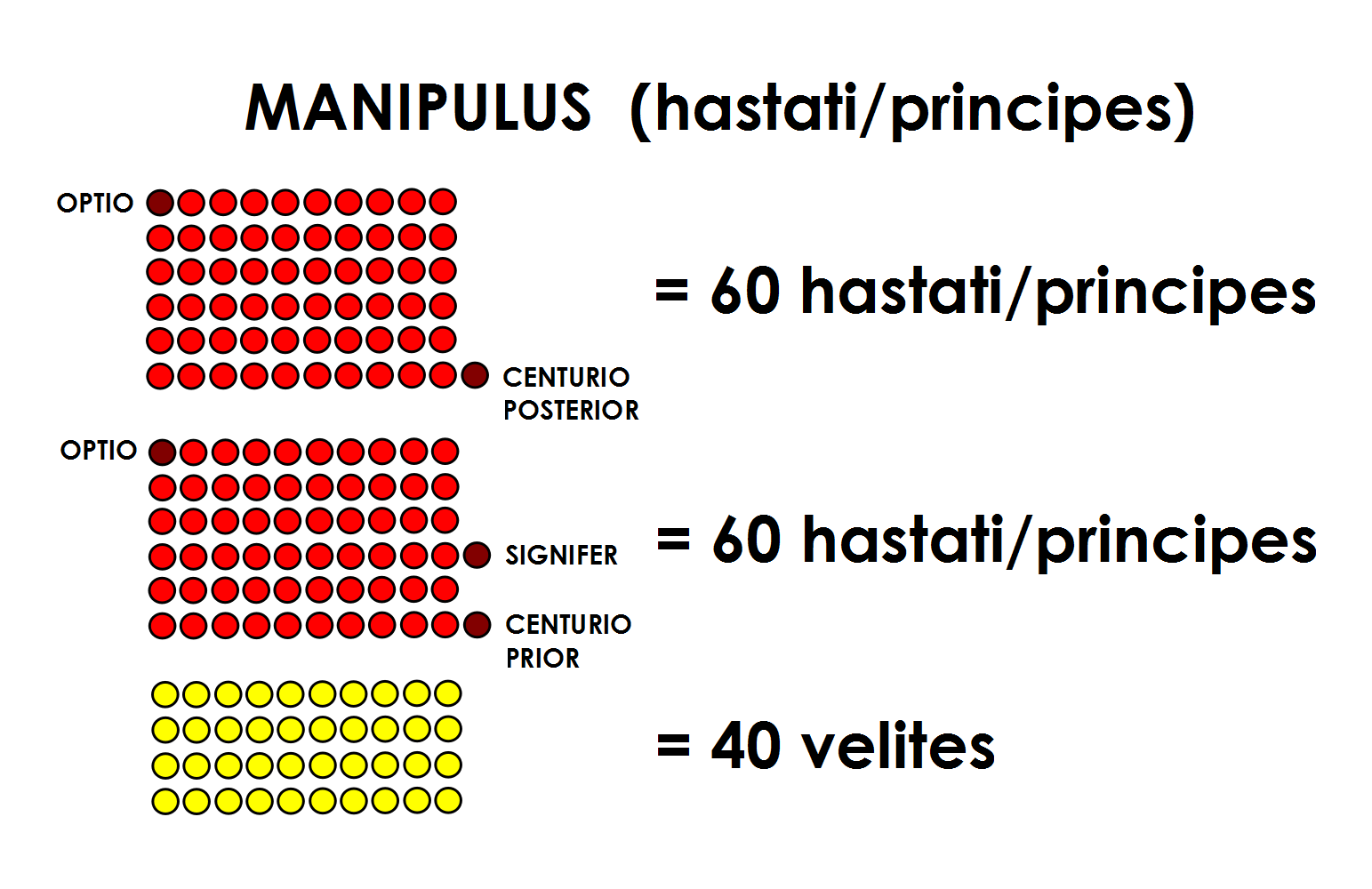

By the time of the Punic Wars of the 3rd century BC, this form of organisation was found to be inefficient. In a new Polybian system, infantry were sorted into classes according to age and experience rather than wealth, the principes being older veterans with a greater degree of experience. Their equipment and role was very similar to the previous system, except they now carried swords, or gladii, instead of spears. Each princeps also carried two pila, heavy javelins that bent on impact to prevent them being removed from the victim or thrown back.

The principes had been increased in number to 1,200 per legion, and formed 10 maniples of 120 men each. The rorarii and accensi had been disbanded. Leves had been replaced with velites, who had a similar role, with forty of them being attached to each maniple in the legion. Pitched battles were conducted in a similar fashion; the velites would gather at the front and fling javelins to cover the advance of the hastati, who had also been re-armed with swords. If the hastati failed to break the enemy, they would fall back on the principes. If the principes could not break them, they would retire behind the triarii, who would then engage the enemy.

This order of battle was almost always followed, the Battle of the Great Plains and the Battle of Zama being among the few notable exceptions. At the Great Plains, Scipio, the Roman general, formed his men up in the usual manner, but once the hastati had begun to engage the enemy, he used his principes and triarii as a flanking force, routing the opposing Carthaginians. At Zama, Scipio arranged his men into columns, side by side, with large lanes in between. The opposing Carthaginian elephants were drawn into these lanes where many were killed by velites without inflicting many casualties on the Romans. Once the surviving elephants had been routed, he formed his men into a long line with his triarii and principes in the centre and hastati on the flanks, ready to engage the Carthaginian infantry.

=== Late republic ===
With the putative reforms of Gaius Marius in 107 BC, intended to combat a shortage of manpower from wars against the Numidian king Jugurtha in North Africa and Germanic tribes to the north, the different classes of units were disbanded entirely with legionaries uniformly armed with gladius and two pilum. Auxiliaries, local irregular troops, would fulfill other roles, serving as archers, skirmishers and cavalry.

== See also ==
- List of Roman army unit types
- Roman infantry tactics
