= Cudon =

Ancient Greek helmet

Cudon or Cudo was a simple, close-fitting helmet resembling a skull-cap, made from leather or the skins of wild animals.

It likely corresponds to the helmet called kataitux (καταῖτυξ) in the Iliad, described as aphalon (ἄφαλον, "without knobs or projections") and alophon (ἄλοφον, "without plume or crest"), which Homer says was worn by Diomedes. The Suda describes the kataitux as a type of helmet without a crest, characterized by a downward-facing design.

The helmet was sometimes secured with a chin strap, referred to in Homer as ocheus (ὀχεύς).

Professor Olga Levaniouk, in her analysis about kataitux, emphasizes that it is a Homeric hapax, a word that appears only once in all of Homer's works. Its meaning seems to have been obscure even in Homer's time, prompting the poem itself to gloss or explain it, and it remained unclear even to later scholiasts. This linguistic rarity, suggests that the Doloneia (Book 10 of the Iliad) engages with particularly ancient or archaic terminology that may have been unfamiliar to Homer’s audience.

The cudo differed from the galerus (a cap of skin or fur) by having smoother and less shaggy fur and was probably similar to what Polybius referred to as liton perikephalaion (λιτὸν περικεφάλαιον, "simple helmet"), worn by Roman velites (light infantry). While some depictions, such as those on Trajan's Column, show soldiers wearing entire animal skins over their heads, this should not be confused with the cudon itself, which was just the cap portion.
