= Armored infantry =

Armored infantry (Commonwealth English: Armoured infantry) can refer to:

- Historical heavy infantry
- Modern infantry of an armored brigade, see Armor infantry
- Modern mechanized infantry
- Modern mechanized infantry of an armored brigade
- Modern mechanized infantry designated for infantry fighting vehicles (IFVs), see Panzergrenadier
