= Triarii =

Veteran Roman legionaries

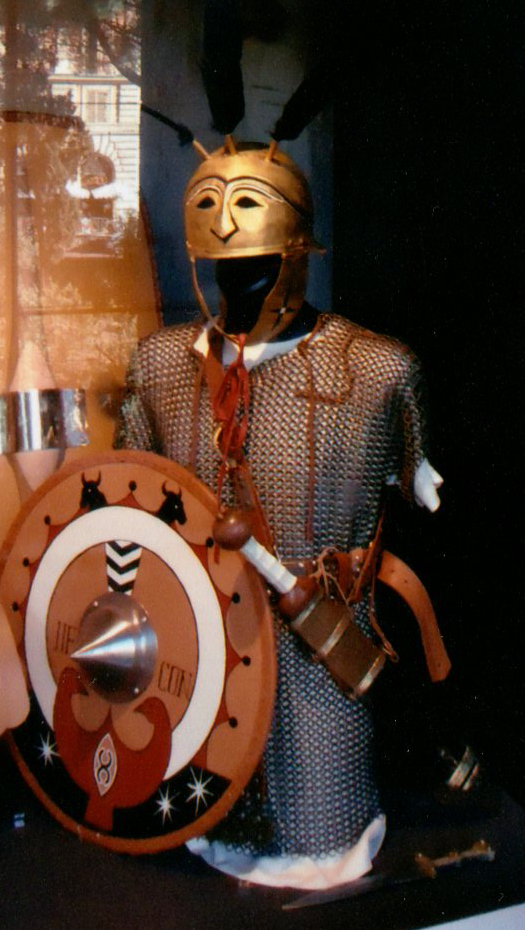
Replica triarius metal mail armor, gladius and shield on display at the Flavian Amphitheater, Rome, Italy

Triarii (sg.: triarius) ("the third liners") were one of the elements of the early Roman military manipular legions of the early Roman Republic (509 BC – 107 BC). They were the oldest and among the wealthiest men in the army and could afford high quality equipment. They wore heavy metal armor and carried large shields, their usual position being the third battle line. They were equipped with spears and were considered to be elite soldiers among the legion.

During the Camillan era, they fought in a shallow phalanx formation, supported by light troops. In most battles triarii were not used because the lighter troops usually defeated the enemy before the triarii were committed to the battle. They were meant to be used as a decisive force in the battle, thus prompting an old Roman saying: res ad triarios venit, 'it comes down to the triarii', which meant carrying on to the bitter end.

== History and deployment ==
According to author Pat Southern, triarii may have evolved from the old first class of the army under the Etruscan kings. The first class comprised the richest soldiers in the legion who were equipped with spears, breastplates and large shields, like heavy Greek hoplites. They served as heavy infantry in the early Roman army, and were used at the front of a very large phalanx formation. After a time, engagements with the Samnites and Gauls appear to have taught the Romans the importance of flexibility and the inadequacy of the phalanx on the rough, hilly ground of central Italy.

=== Camillan era ===
By the 4th century BC, the military formations the Romans had inherited from the Etruscans were still in use. Though their efficiency was doubtful, they proved effective against Rome's largely local adversaries. When Gauls invaded Etruria in 390 BC, the inhabitants requested help from Rome. The small contingent Rome sent to repel the Gallic invaders provoked a full-scale attack on Rome and the entire Roman army was destroyed at the Battle of the Allia.

This crushing defeat prompted a series of military reforms by Marcus Furius Camillus. Under the new system, men were sorted into classes according to wealth, the triarii being the richest after the mounted equites. Triarii were armed with spears, or hastae, about 2 metres (6½ feet) long. They also carried swords, or gladii, about 84 centimetres (29 inches) long, in case the spear broke or the enemy drew too close.

They fought as hoplites, usually carrying clipei, large round Greek shields, and wearing bronze helmets, often with a number of feathers fixed onto the top to increase stature. Heavy plate armour was favoured, with mail also being popular. Many would paint or engrave portraits of ancestors onto their shield, believing that it would bring them luck in battle.

In this new type of unit, the 900 triarii formed 15 maniples, military units of 60 men each, which were in turn part of 15 ordines, larger units made up of a maniple of triarii, a maniple of rorarii and a maniple of accensi. The triarii stood in the third line of the legion, behind the front line of hastati and the second line of principes, and in front of the rorarii and accensi. In a pitched battle, the leves, javelin-armed skirmishers who were attached to maniples of hastati, would form up at the front of the legion and harass the enemy with javelin fire and cover the advance of the hastati, spear-armed infantry.

If the hastati failed to break the enemy, they would fall back and let the principes, heavier and more experienced infantry, take over. If the principes did not break them, they would retire behind the triarii, who would then engage the enemy in turn—hence the expression rem ad Triarios redisse, "it has come to the triarii"—signaling an act of desperation. The equites, cavalrymen, were used as flankers and to pursue routing enemies. The rorarii, the poorer reserve soldiers, and accensi, the least dependable troops armed with slings, would be used in a support role, providing mass and supporting wavering areas of the line.

=== Polybian system ===
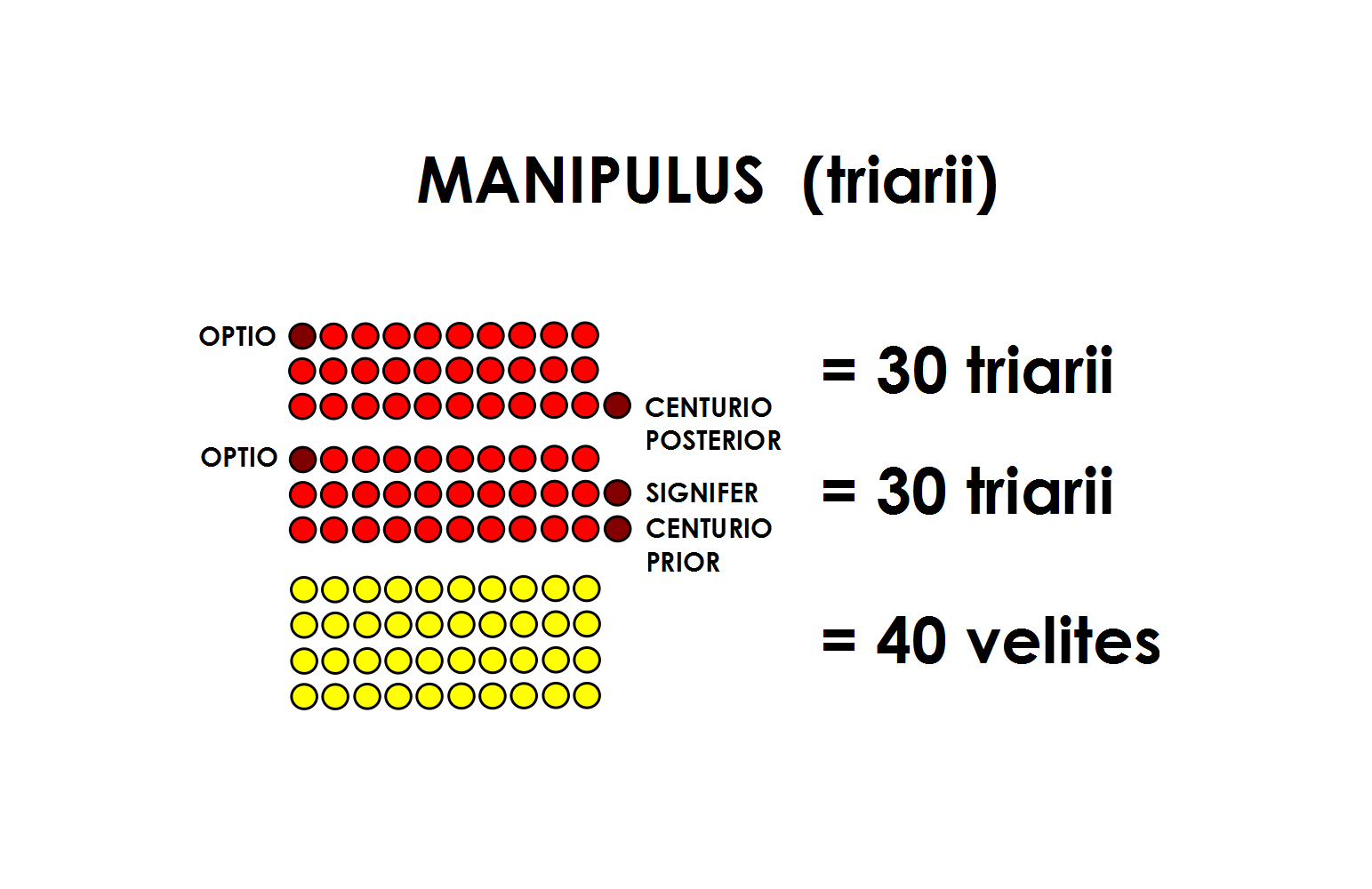

By the time of the Second Punic War of the late 3rd century BC, this system had proved inefficient against enemies such as Carthage. After a series of more "organic" changes as opposed to a single intentional reform, a new system gradually came into being. Infantry were sorted into classes according to age and experience rather than wealth, the triarii being the most experienced. Their equipment and role was very similar to the previous system, except they now carried scuta, large rectangular shields that offered a greater degree of protection than the old round clipeus.

The number of triarii were reduced to 600 per legion, forming 10 maniples of 60 men each. The triarii still made up the third line in the legion, behind the front line of hastati and the second line of principes, but the rorarii and accensi were phased out. Leves had been replaced with velites, who had a similar role but were also attached to principes and triarii.

Pitched battles were conducted in a similar fashion: the velites would gather at the front and fling javelins to cover the advance of the hastati. If the hastati failed to break the enemy, they would fall back on the principes, who along with the hastati, had been re-equipped with pila rather than spears. If the principes could not break the enemy they would retire behind the triarii, who would then engage the enemy.

This order of battle was almost always followed, the Battle of the Great Plains and the Battle of Zama being among the few notable exceptions. At the Great Plains, Scipio, the Roman general, formed his men up in the usual manner, but once the hastati had begun to engage the enemy, he used his principes and triarii as a flanking force, routing the opposing Carthaginians. At Zama, Scipio arranged his men into columns, side-by-side, with large lanes in between. The opposing Carthaginian elephants were drawn into these lanes where many were killed by velites without inflicting many casualties on the Romans. Once the surviving elephants had been routed, Scipio formed his men into a long line with his triarii and principes in the centre and hastati on the flanks, ready to engage the Carthaginian infantry.

=== Late republic ===
With the putative military reforms of Gaius Marius in 107 BC, implemented to combat a shortage of manpower due to wars against Jugurtha in Africa and Germanic tribes to the north, the different classes of units were scrapped entirely. Auxiliaries, local irregular troops, would fulfill other roles, serving as archers, skirmishers and cavalry. Sallust, in his Jugurthine War, describes several instances in which Roman or allied regular heavy infantry were equipped with light equipment and used as light footsoldiers. This was supposedly a common practice.

== See also ==
- List of Roman army unit types
