= Leves =

Leves (sg.: levis) were javelin-armed skirmishers in the army of the early Roman Republic. They were typically some of the youngest and poorest men in the legion, and could not afford much equipment. They were usually outfitted with just a number of light javelins and no other equipment. There were 300 leves in a legion, and unlike other infantry types they did not form their own units, but were assigned to units of hastati – heavier sword-armed troops. Their primary purpose on the battlefield was to harass the enemy with javelin fire and support the heavy infantry who fought in hand-to-hand combat. Accensi and rorarii were also light missile troops and had similar roles.

== History and deployment ==
Leves appear to have evolved from the old poor classes of the army under the Etruscan kings when it was reformed by Marcus Furius Camillus ca. 386 BC. These soldiers stood at the rear of a very large phalanx and were equipped in a similar manner to leves. They provided missile support to the richer hand-to-hand infantry in the front ranks, and also acted as a screening force. It is probable that engagements with the Samnites and a crushing defeat at the hands of the Gallic warlord Brennus, who both used many smaller military units rather than a few very large ones, taught the Romans the importance of flexibility and the inadequacy of the phalanx on the rough, hilly ground of central Italy.

=== Camillan system ===
By the 4th century BC the military the Romans had inherited from the Etruscans was still in use. Though its efficiency was doubtful, it proved effective against Rome's largely local adversaries. When Gauls invaded Etruria in 390 BC, the inhabitants requested help from Rome. The small contingent Rome sent to repel the Gallic invaders provoked a full-scale attack on Rome. The entire Roman army was destroyed at the Battle of the Allia in a crushing defeat that prompted reforms by Marcus Furius Camillus. Under the new system, men were sorted into classes based on wealth; the leves were some of the poorest, along with the rorarii and accensi. Leves typically carried a number of light javelins and a simple round shield about 90 cm (3 feet) in diameter. The larger rectangular Scutum was sometimes carried by those soldiers who could afford it. They fought in a loose formation, often forming up at the front of the army before battle to pepper the enemy with missiles.

Under this organisation, the 300 leves were attached to units of hastati, heavy sword armed troops, rather than forming their own units. In a pitched battle, the leves would form up at the front of the legion and harass the enemy with javelin fire to cover the advance of the hastati and other heavy infantry. The equites, cavalrymen, were used as flankers and to pursue routing enemies. The rorarii and accensi in the final battle line were used in a support role, providing mass and reinforcing wavering areas of the line.

=== Polybian system ===
The Camillan system of organisation proved inefficient, in part due to the relatively large number of light troops, and sometime in the mid-3rd century BC, was restructured. In a new system, described by Polybius, the different types of light troops were done away with and replaced by a single skirmisher class, the velites. Their equipment and role was very similar to that of the leves, to harass the enemy with missile fire and support friendly troops.

== See also ==
- Equites
