= Velites =

Type of light infantry of Ancient Rome

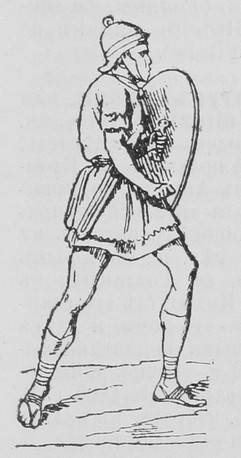
Veles

Velites (Latin: [ˈweːlɪteːs]; sg.: veles) were a class of infantry in the Roman army of the mid-Republic from 211 to 107 BC. Velites were light infantry and skirmishers armed with javelins (Latin: hastae velitares), each with a 75cm (30 inch) wooden shaft the diameter of a finger, with a 25cm (10 inch) narrow metal point, to fling at the enemy. They also carried short thrusting swords, or gladii, for use in melee. They rarely wore armour as they were the youngest and poorest soldiers in the legion and could not afford much equipment, but they did carry small wooden shields called parma for protection. The velites were placed at the front partly for tactical reasons, and also so that they had the opportunity to secure glory for themselves in single combat.

Velites did not form their own units; a number of them were attached to each maniple of hastati, principes and triarii. They were typically used as a screening force, driving off enemy skirmishers and disrupting enemy formations with javelin throws before retiring behind the lines to allow the heavier-armed hastati to attack. They were normally the ones who engaged war elephants and chariots if they were present on the field, such as in the Battle of Zama, in 202 BC. Their high mobility and ranged weaponry made them much more effective against these enemies than heavy infantry. An early Roman legion contained approximately 1000 velites. Velites were disbanded after the Marian reforms. Lucilius suggests that rorarii and velites were interchangeable, with velites gradually superseding rorarii. Another theory is that the leves' equipment was upgraded until they were at the same level as the rorarii, and they both collectively became known as the velites.

== Equipment ==
A veles in combat

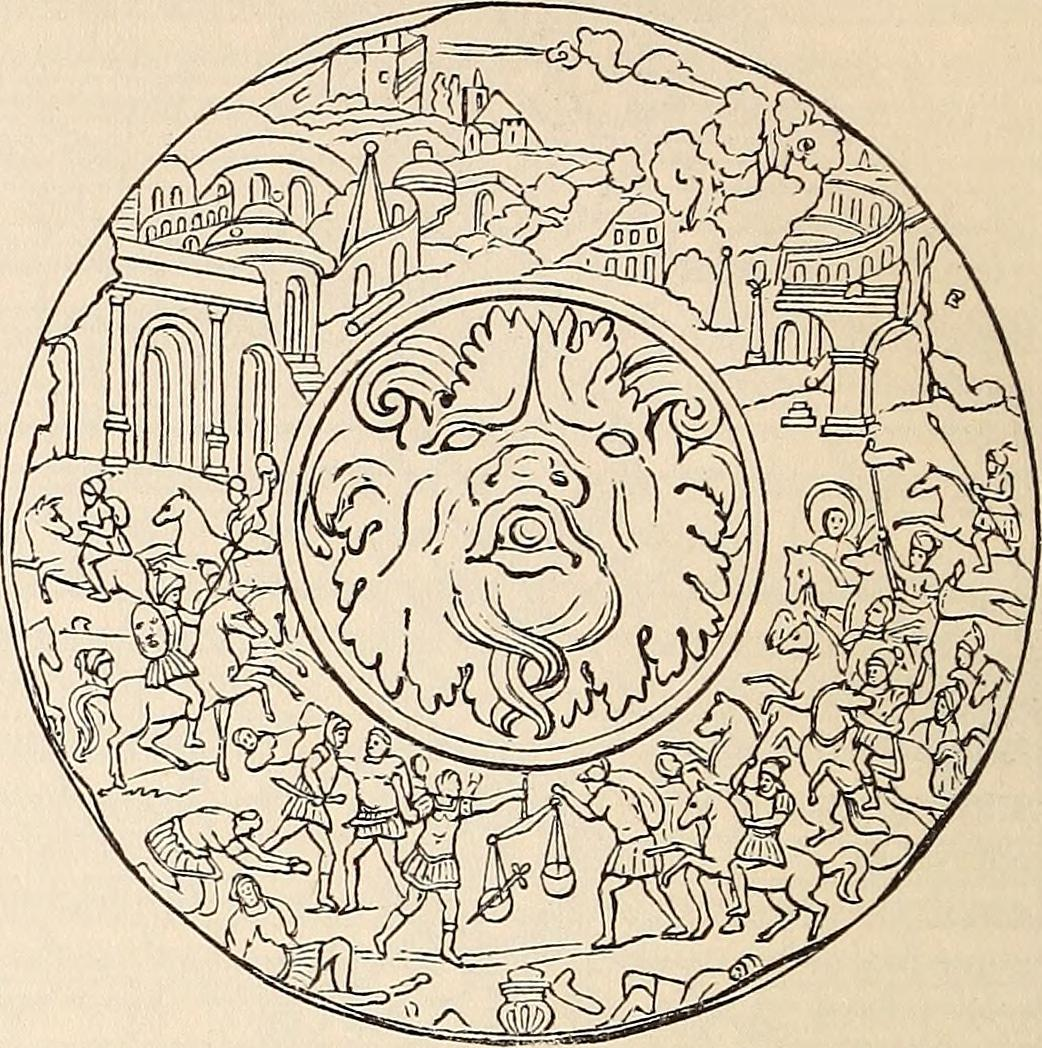
A stylized parma

Velites were the youngest and usually the poorest (being fifth class citizens, with property worth 400–2,500 denarii) soldiers in the legion, and could rarely afford much equipment. They were armed with vereta, light javelins, each with a 90 cm (3 ft) wooden shaft the diameter of a finger, with a c. 25cm (10 inch) narrow metal point, and tips designed to bend on impact to prevent them being thrown back, similar to the heavier pila of other legionaries. Livy says that they each carried seven javelins, but Roman satirist Lucilius says that they carried five, suggesting that the amount may have changed. The hastati and principes carried gladii, relatively short thrusting swords 74 centimetres (29 inches) in length, as their main weapons, and the velites carried them as backup weapons. They fought in a very loose, staggered formation like most irregular troops, and carried small round shields called parma, 90 cm (3 feet) in diameter.

The velites were placed at the front of the maniples, so that the velites had the chance to prove themselves and win glory by seeking out single combat with an enemy. This is also why some wore highly identifiable headdresses over their helmets, for example wolf skins.

"These are not given to a soldier if in the formed array... but to those who in the skirmishing or in similar circumstances in which there is no need to engage in single combat, have voluntarily and by choice placed themselves in danger."

— Polybius

== Organization ==
Dispositions after deployment but prior to engagement

Dispositions after velities engagement and withdrawal

In the legion, the velites were attached to each maniple of hastati, principes and triarii. They usually formed up at the front of the legion before battle to harass the enemy with javelin throws and to prevent the enemy doing the same before retiring behind the lines to allow the heavier infantry to attack. After they had fallen back, they would move up behind the attacking troops and throw darts at the enemy. They also sometimes carried wounded back to the rear, although a corps of deportates usually did this. In a pitched battle, the velites would form up at the front of the legion and cover the advance of the hastati, who were armed with swords. If the hastati failed to break the enemy, they would fall back and let the principes, similarly equipped though more experienced infantry, take over. If the principes failed, they would retire behind the triarii, well trained, heavily armoured, spear armed legionaries and let them attack.

The number of triarii was fixed at 600 per legion, there were usually 1,200 hastati and 1,200 principes per legion, with the rest being light infantry like the velites. In the standard legion around the time of the Second Punic War (218 -201 BC) there were 10 maniples of hastati, each having 120 hastati, with 40 velites attached. The maniples were further split into centuries, of 60 hastati and 20 velites, with the centurion of the hastati century commanding the velites as well.

After the Romans were ambushed at the Battle of Lake Trasimene, which remains the largest ambush in military history by men involved, in 217 BC, Quintus Fabius Maximus Verrucosus introduced a military step known as the agmen. It was a variable formation, with one or more columns, separated by cohorts, with their allies in between the cohorts. The front of the columns were the extraordinarii, along with some of the velites. Following this formation was a rear-guard of the ablecti, and the rest of the velites. The baggage trail was guarded by the cavalry. Both the front and the flanks contained a number of speculatores (scouts), to provide warning of an enemy army's approach. When enemies were nearby, the baggage train would be dispersed between the maniples. If the columns were forced to retreat, the velites and the extraordinarii that were in the front guarded the retreat of the others; this contrasts with their usual method of retreat, in which the cavalry, the velites, and the triarii stayed behind and covered the retreat.

When the Romans set up a temporary castra, two maniples (without their velites) were selected to pitch the tents of the headquarters and officers, and details were made for fatigue duty, to get wood and water, and to give food and water to the animals accompanying them. The rest of the men, excepting velites and officers, set up the tents of the soldiers. During this time the velites would guard the outside of the wall and the wall itself, while the rest of the troops would guard the interior. The watch, which was composed of eight men led by a decurion, ran from 6:00 am to 6:00 pm, and was divided into four shifts, each of three hours.

== History ==
Velites were descended from an earlier class of light infantry, leves, dating from the Camillan legion of the 5th century BC, who had a very similar role to the velites. They were also the poorer and younger soldiers in the legion, though the rorarii and accensi classes were considerably poorer and were eventually disbanded, having insufficient equipment to be effective soldiers. Leves were likewise armed with a number of javelins, but carried a spear rather than a sword. Like the velites, leves did not have their own units, but were attached to units of hastati. Lucilius, however, suggests that rorarii and velites were interchangeable, with velites gradually superseding rorarii. Another theory is that the leves' equipment was upgraded until they were at the same level as the rorarii, and they both collectively became known as the velites.

Velites were first used, and created, at the siege of Capua in 211 BC, and were made up of citizens who would normally be too poor to join the hastati but were called up due a shortage of manpower. They were trained to ride on horseback with the equites and jump down at a given signal to fling javelins at the enemy. After the siege, they were adopted into the legions as a force of irregular light infantry for ambushing and harassing the enemy with javelins before the battle began in earnest.

The velites were used against the Carthaginian elephants in the Battle of Zama. After their usual javelin throw, the velites took cover behind the maniples, and then launched a sortie, quickly coming out from behind the troops and attacking the elephants, before retreating again.

With the putative reforms of Gaius Marius in 107 BC, designed to combat a shortage of manpower due to wars against Jugurtha, the different classes of units were disbanded entirely.

Various light troops in the Imperial Guard of Napoleon were named after the Roman velites.

== See also ==
- List of Roman army unit types
