= Rorarii =

Pre-Marian Roman reserve infantry

Rorarii were soldiers who formed the final lines, or else provided a reserve thereby, in the ancient pre-Marian Roman army. They may have been used with the triarii in battle near the final stages of fighting, since they are recorded as being located at the rear of the main battle formation.

They may have been similar in role to the accensi, acting as supernumeraries and filling the places of fallen soldiers as a battle or campaign wore on. Alternatively, they may have been skirmishers akin to velites as stated by Livy in Book VIII.8. Unfortunately, the evidence is so limited that it is difficult to understand what direct role the rorarii may have had, if any, in fighting. It seems most likely that they were not part of the line in the same way as triarii, principes and hastati were. They may also have been the light equivalent of the triarii, just like the accensi would have been the light equivalent of the principes, both rorarii and accensi reinforcing the triarii.

== See also ==
- List of Roman army unit types
