= Hastati =

Class of Roman infantry soldier

Hastati (sg.: hastatus) were a class of infantry employed in the armies of the early Roman Republic, who originally fought as spearmen and later as swordsmen. These soldiers were the staple unit after Rome threw off Etruscan rule. They were originally some of the poorest men in the legion, and could afford only modest equipment—light chainmail and other miscellaneous equipment. The Senate supplied their soldiers with only a short stabbing sword, the gladius, and their distinctive squared shield, the scutum. The hastatus was typically equipped with these, and one or two soft iron tipped throwing spears called pila. This doubled their effectiveness, not only as a strong leading edge to their maniple, but also as a stand-alone missile troop. Later, the hastati contained the younger men rather than just the poorer, though most men of their age were relatively poor. Their usual position was the first battle line. They fought in a quincunx formation, supported by lighter infantry. The enemy was allowed to penetrate the first battle line consisting of hastati, after which the enemy would deal with the more hardened, seasoned soldiers, the principes. They were eventually disbanded after the so-called "Marian reforms" of 107 BC.

== History and deployment ==
Hastati appear to have been remnants of the old third class of the army under the Etruscan kings when it was reformed by Marcus Furius Camillus. The third class stood in the last few ranks of a very large phalanx and were equipped in a similar manner to hastati, although they were more often than not relegated to providing missile support to the higher classes rather than fighting themselves. Penrose and Southern postulate that it is probable that engagements with the Samnites and a crushing defeat at the hands of the Gallic warlord Brennus, who both used many smaller military units rather than a few larger ones, taught the Romans the importance of flexibility and the inadequacy of the phalanx on the rough, hilly ground of central Italy.

=== Camillan system ===
By the 4th century BC the military the Romans had inherited from the Etruscans was still being used. Though its efficiency was doubtful, it proved effective against Rome's largely local adversaries. When Gauls invaded Etruria in 390 BC, the inhabitants requested help from Rome. The small contingent Rome sent to repel the Gallic invaders provoked a full-scale attack on Rome. The entire Roman army was destroyed at the Battle of the Allia in a crushing defeat that prompted reforms by Marcus Furius Camillus. Under the new system, men were sorted into classes based on wealth; the hastati were the third poorest, with the rorarii being slightly poorer and the principes slightly wealthier. Hastati were armed with short spears, or hastae, up to 1.8 metres (6 ft) long, from which the soldiers acquired their name. They fought in a quincunx formation, usually carrying scuta, large rectangular shields, and wearing bronze helmets, often with a number of feathers fixed onto the top to increase stature. They wore light armour, the most common form being small breastplates, called "heart protectors".

In this type of legion, the 900 hastati formed 15 maniples, military units of 60 men each. Attached to each maniple were about 20 leves, javelin-armed light infantry. The hastati stood in the first battle line, in front of the principes of the second line and the triarii of the third. In a pitched battle, the leves would form up at the front of the legion and harass the enemy with their javelins to cover the advance of the hastati. If the hastati failed to break the enemy during their engagement, they would fall back and let the heavier principes take over. If the principes could not break them, they would retire behind the triarii spearmen, who would then engage the enemy in turn. The equites, cavalrymen, were used as flankers and to pursue routed enemies. The rorarii and accensi in the final battle line were some of the least dependable troops, and were used in a support role, providing mass and reinforcing wavering areas of the line.

=== Polybian system ===
By the time of the Punic Wars of the 3rd century BC, the Camillan organisational system had been found to be inefficient. Under a new Polybian system, infantry were sorted into classes according to age and experience rather than wealth, with the hastati being the youngest and least experienced. Their equipment and role was very similar to that which existed under the previous system, except they now carried swords, or gladii, instead of spears. Each hastatus also carried two pila, heavy javelins that, according to Goldsworthy "contrary to deeply entrenched myth" did not bend on impact to make any struck shield useless or prevent the weapon from being thrown back. The weight and barb alone sufficiently hampered any struck shield (often penetrating the shield to hit the man behind it), and the iron was sufficiently hard that pila were often used as hand-held spears against both infantry and cavalry. By the time the volley of pila had reached the enemy line (usually only fifteen yards distant for best effect), the legionaries were charging and very quickly at work with their swords. There was rarely any time for the foe to find a pilum, pull it out of whatever it had hit and throw it back.

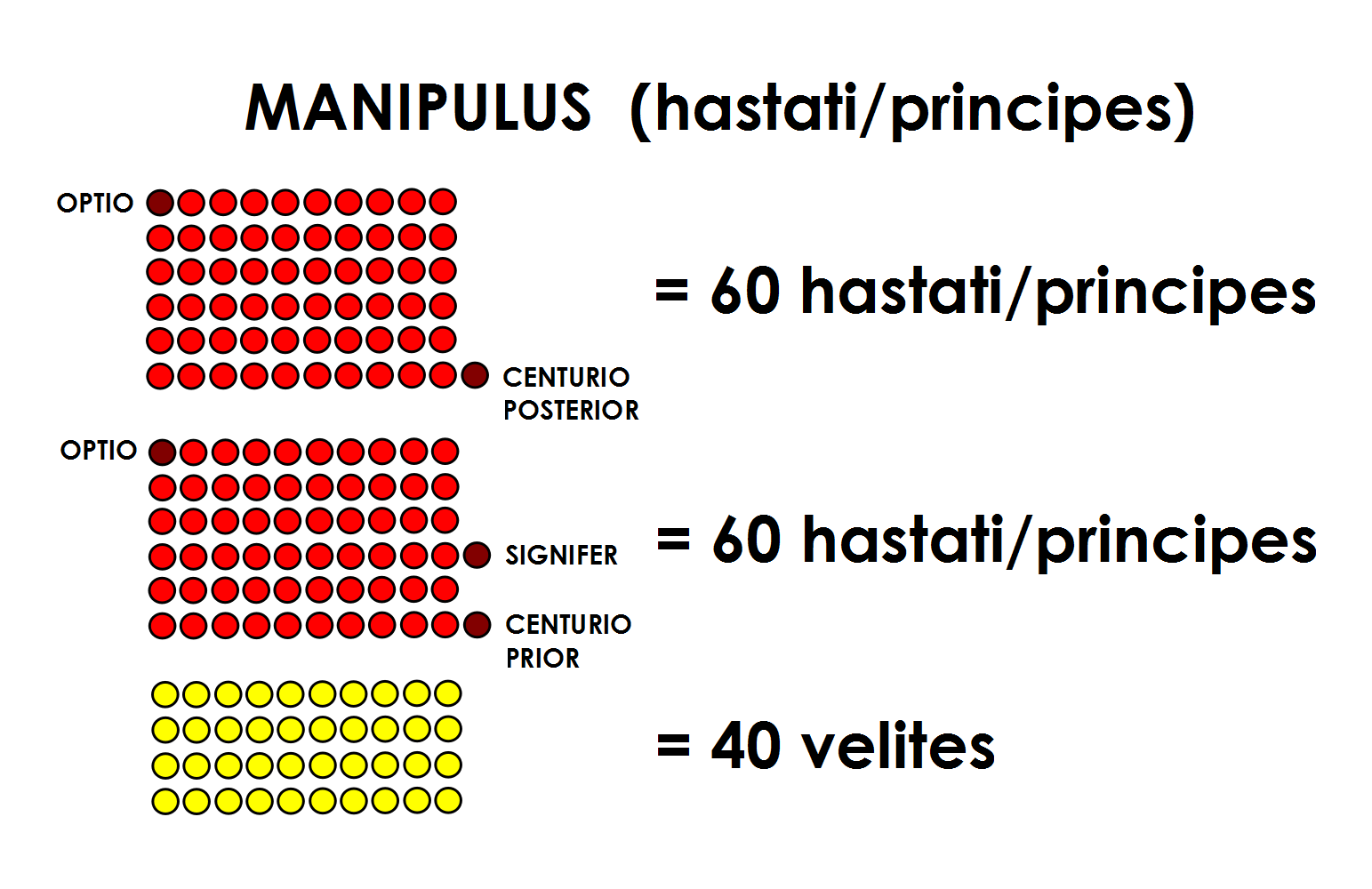
The formation and alignment of hastati

The hastati had been increased in number to 1,200 per legion, and formed 10 maniples of 120 men each. The rorarii and accensi had been disbanded. Leves had been replaced with velites, who had a similar role but were now also attached to principes and triarii. Pitched battles were conducted in a similar fashion; the velites would gather at the front and fling javelins to cover the advance of the hastati. If the hastati failed to break the enemy, they would fall back on the principes, who had also been re-armed with swords. If the principes could not break them, they would retire behind the triarii, who would then engage the enemy.

This order of battle was almost always followed, the battle of the Great Plains and the battle of Zama being among the few notable exceptions. At the Great Plains, Scipio, the Roman general, formed his men up in the usual manner, but once the hastati had begun to engage the enemy, he used his principes and triarii as a flanking force, routing the opposing Carthaginian troops.

At Zama, Scipio arranged his men into columns, side by side, with large lanes in between. The opposing Carthaginian elephants were drawn into these lanes where many were killed by velites without inflicting many casualties on the Romans. Once the surviving elephants had been routed, Scipio formed his men into a long line with his triarii and principes in the centre and hastati on the flanks, ready to engage the Carthaginian infantry.

=== Late republic ===
With the putative reforms of Gaius Marius in 107 BC, intended to combat a shortage of manpower from wars against Jugurtha, king of Numidia in North Africa and Germanic tribes to the north, the different classes of units were disbanded entirely. Auxiliaries, local irregular troops, would fulfill other roles, serving as archers, skirmishers and cavalry.

== See also ==
- List of Roman army unit types
- Roman infantry tactics
- Structural history of the Roman military
