= Marian reforms =

Putative reforms of the Roman military in 107 BC

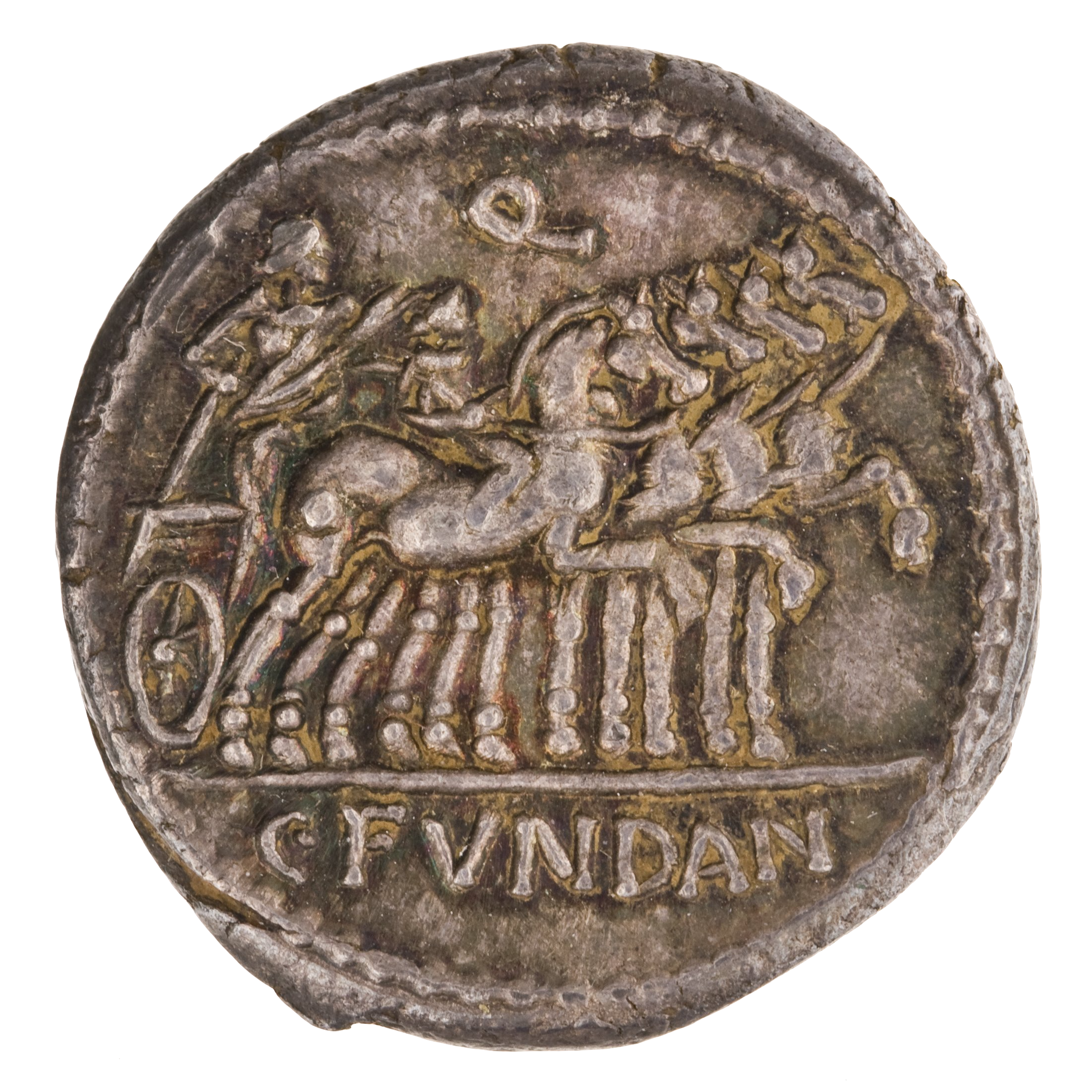
Gaius Marius, depicted as a triumphator in a coin minted by Gaius Fundanius in 101 BC. He triumphed due to his victory in the Cimbric War.

The Marian reforms were putative changes to the composition and operation of the Roman army during the late Roman Republic usually attributed to Gaius Marius (a general who was consul in 107, 104–100, and 86 BC). The most important of these concerned the altering of the socio-economic background of the soldiery. Other changes were supposed to have included the introduction of the cohort; the institution of a single form of heavy infantry with uniform equipment; the universal adoption of the eagle standard; and the abolition of the citizen cavalry. It was commonly believed that Marius changed the soldiers' socio-economic background by allowing citizens without property to join the Roman army, a process called "proletarianisation". This was thought to have created a semi-professional class of soldiers motivated by land grants; these soldiers in turn became clients of their generals, who then used them to overthrow the republic.

Belief in a comprehensive scheme of reforms under Marius emerged in 1840s German scholarship, which posited that any changes in the Roman army between the times of Polybius and Marius were attributable to a single reform event. This belief was spread relatively uncritically and was accepted as largely proven by the 1850s and through much of the 20th century. There is, however, little ancient evidence for any permanent or significant change to recruitment practice in Marius' time. The occurrence of such a comprehensive reform led by Marius is no longer widely accepted by specialists; 21st-century scholars have called the reforms a "construct of modern scholarship".

Other reforms to the army's operations and equipment, said to have been implemented by Marius, are also largely rejected by scholars. Few of them have any basis in the ancient and archaeological evidence. Others are wrongly dated or misattributed. Changes in the Roman army of the late republic did occur, but appear to have happened later than at the end of the 2nd century BC. Rather, these shifts were during the Social War and following civil wars, and emerged from circumstance rather than a reformist Marian vision.

== Background ==
The Roman army traditionally found its manpower by conscription from the top five census classes. Those classes were assigned in decreasing order of wealth and allotted citizens to a corresponding century in the comitia centuriata. These citizens were called adsidui. Citizens who owned less wealth than that required for bottom of the fifth census class were called capite censi (lit. 'those counted by head') or proletarii. These least-wealthy citizens were grouped into a single century which voted after all the others. Under this scheme, the proletarii were exempt from conscription except when an emergency, called a tumultus, was declared; under such circumstances, the poorest were levied as well. The first documented instance of the proletarii being called up was some time in the fourth century; they first received arms at state expense in 281 BC, probably related to the start of the Pyrrhic War.

For much of the 20th century, historians held that the property qualification separating the five classes and the capite censi was reduced over the course of the second century to a nugatory level due to a shortage of manpower. The basis for that belief, however, was merely three undated Roman figures for the amount of property required to serve which would serve as evidence for reductions only if forced into a descending order. Many scholars have also now abandoned the notion that Italy suffered in the second century BC any deficit of manpower which would have driven such putative reductions.

== Attributed reforms ==
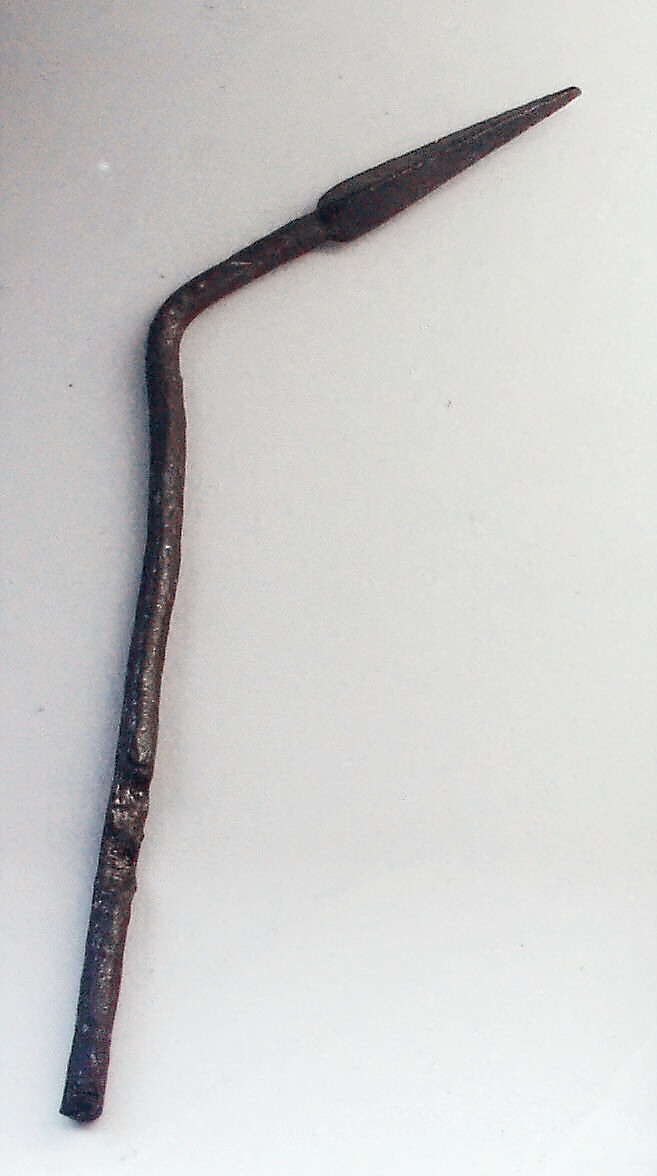
The head of a pilum bent on impact after throwing

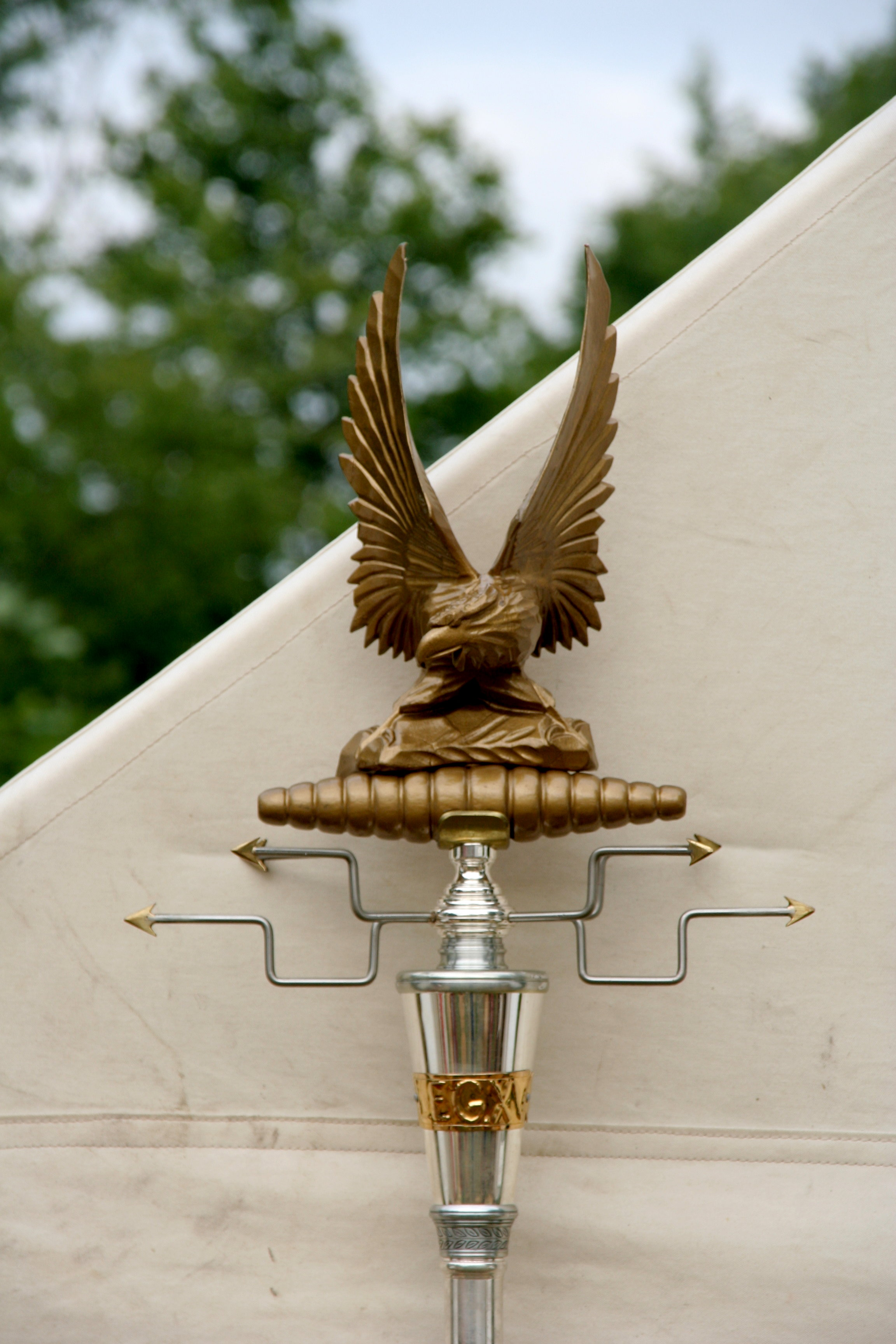
Modern reconstruction of a Roman aquila. Marius, according to Pliny, abolished non-eagle legionary standards.

Some or all of the following reforms have been attributed to Marius in modern historiography. They are, however, variably dated. Many modern sources date them to his first consulship, during the Jugurthine War against Jugurtha of Numidia, in 107 BC. However, it is also possible that other far-reaching actions, especially in opening army recruitment, were undertaken during Marius' repeated consulships from 104 to 100 BC during which Rome faced the serious threat of Germanic invasion.

=== Ancient attributions ===
Marius was credited with setting the precedent for recruiting the poor by the historian Valerius Maximus writing in the early 1st century AD. Two further reforms (distinguished from mere actions taken by Marius) are attributed, in sources postdating his career by hundreds of years, to Marius directly: a redesign of the pilum and sole use of the eagle as the legionary standard.

==== Army proletarianisation ====
The main putative reform attributed to Marius is a change to recruitment starting, as is generally held, in 107 BC. In that year, Marius was consul, had himself assigned by plebiscite to the war against Jugurtha, and recruited additional soldiers to send to war by enlisting volunteers from both those in the five census classes and also the capite censi. The senate had in fact given Marius the right to conscript, but he chose to also enrol some three to five thousand volunteers.

Various motives have been ascribed to Marius' decision to accept volunteers. The motive attributed in Sallust, Marius' personal ambition to seize power, may more reflect Sallust's desire to connect the republic's collapse with moral decline and failure to adhere to tradition. The second edition Cambridge Ancient History viewed it as an expedient to evade popular opposition to conscription. R J Evans, with whom François Cadiou agreed, instead proposed that Marius' decision emerged from his promise of a quick victory in Numidia followed by an energetic effort to follow through by raising and bringing an army as quickly as possible to Africa so to maximise his time campaigning as consul. Regardless, after Marius' victorious return from the Jugurthine War, his volunteers were discharged and, in the following Cimbric War, he assumed command of consular legions recruited via hitherto normal procedure.

It was believed that Marius' decision to enlist volunteers from the capite censi changed the socio-economic background of the army by allowing the poor to take it over. These poor soldiers then professionalised and lived only as soldiers. These professional soldiers, disconnected from a society in which they had no property stake, over time became clients of their generals who then used them to seize power in Rome and plunge the republic into civil wars that eventually brought about its collapse. It is largely accepted, however, that Roman conscription continued to take place after 107. Nor is there much evidence that later Roman armies during the 1st century BC were made up of volunteers; almost all ancient references to army recruitment, outside private armies, involve conscription.

Conscription continued after Marius' time, especially during the Social War, and the wealth and social background of the men who joined before and after the opening of recruitment changed little. Pay remained extremely low – only five asses per day – and irregular. Moreover, although the surviving sources frequently characterise soldiers as "poor", these sources largely reflect the perspectives of the elite, by whom the vast majority of the population were considered "poor" and for whom the notion of poverty was broader than actual landlessness. Many of the soldiers of the 1st century BC possessed modest lands. Nor did the legions meaningfully professionalise: as, in general, both soldiers and commanders served only for short periods intending, respectively, to secure plunder or political advancement from military victory. There is little evidence that this putative change in army recruitment created anti-republican client armies.

==== Equipment changes ====
Beyond changes to army recruitment, there are two other reforms attributed to Marius specifically in the ancient sources: a redesign for a javelin, and the designation of the aquila (eagle) as the universal legionary standard.

Plutarch relates that Marius altered the design of the Roman pilum, a heavy javelin designed to stick into shields, by including a wooden peg which broke when the javelin was thrown. Many scholars believe this was to prevent the javelin from being thrown back, but it is more likely that the swinging motion of the broken peg was meant to force someone to discard a shield into which the javelin was struck. Regardless of the efficacy or purpose of the redesign, archaeological evidence from the 80s BC through to the early imperial era show that Marius' redesign was not adopted. Roman pila without Marius' peg often bent or broke on impact, but this was more likely a by-product of their long, narrow shanks than an intentional feature.

Pliny's Natural History attributes Marius with adopting the eagle as the universal legionary standard. This has been interpreted as a rallying symbol for each cohort. Pliny's claim, however, is incorrect; sources show late republican and early imperial legions with other animal symbols such as bulls and wolves.

=== Modern attributions ===
Most of the reforms attributed to Marius in various sources emerged only in modern times. These reforms have little ancient pedigree. They rest largely on the basis of comparison between the army described by Polybius and the army in the texts of the 1st century BC with an assumed attribution to Marius.

==== Equipment at state expense ====
It is also sometimes claimed that Marius – because the poor citizens enrolled could not afford to purchase their own weapons and armour – arranged for the state to supply them with arms, displacing the traditional system of self-purchase. Such a scheme may have been incipient during Gaius Gracchus' plebeian tribunate (c. 122 BC); according to Plutarch, Gracchus passed a law to abolish deductions from soldier pay for clothing. The Italian historian Emilio Gabba argued, for example, that Plutarch's text could be emended from merely encompassing clothing to equipment more generally, reflecting Gabba's belief that this policy emerged from the recruitment of poor soldiers unable to pay for their own equipment.

Neither a Gracchan abolition of deductions for equipment or a Marian programme to equip soldiers is attested in the evidence. There are no indications that Gracchus' law ever came into effect and literary evidence indicates that deductions for clothing and equipment were common in the imperial army of Augustus into the 1st century AD. If Marius purchased equipment for his troops in Numidia at his own expense, later generals and the state in general did not do so.

==== "Marius' mules" and training ====
Marius is said in ancient sources to have moved much of the baggage off beasts of burden and onto the backs of the common soldiers, giving them the moniker muli Mariani ("Marius' mules"). Some modern historians have read this action as a permanent reduction in the size of Roman baggage trains, increasing the speed of army movement. However, attempts to force soldiers to carry their own equipment were common among successful generals at the time; Marius' predecessor in Numidia, Quintus Caecilius Metellus, as well as Scipio Aemilianus, was said to have forced their soldiers to carry their own equipment.

Some modern historians have also attributed to Marius reforms in the training of Roman soldiers which ostensibly reflected a professionalising service. Such training and drilling, however, had become common before Marius due to the loss of collective experience in the generations after the Second Punic War. Quintus Fabius Maximus Aemilianus drilled his men for almost a year before deploying them in the Lusitanian War (c. 145 BC); Scipio Aemilianus, for example, drilled his men before his campaigns against Numantia (c. 133 BC); Metellus similarly drilled his men prior to their departure to Africa in 109 BC. Such attempts to reintroduce discipline reflected the recruits' lack of military training rather than a class of budding professional soldiers.

==== Unit composition ====
Modern historians have sometimes credited to Marius the abolition of Roman cavalry and light infantry and their replacement with auxilia. There is no direct evidence for this contention, which is driven largely by literary sources' silence on those branches after the 2nd century; continued inscriptional evidence attests both citizen cavalry and light infantry into the end of the republic. The decline of Roman light infantry has been connected not to reform but cost. Because the logistical cost of supporting light infantry and heavy infantry was relatively similar, the Romans chose to deploy heavy infantry in extended and distant campaigns due to their greater combat effectiveness, especially when local levies could substitute for light infantry brought from Rome and Italy.

Marius has also been credited with the introduction of the cohort (a unit of 480 men) in place of the maniple (a unit of only 160 men) as the basic unit of manoeuvre. This attribution is rather dubious and there is no ancient evidence of it; cohorts may have been used as far back as the Second Punic War near the end of the third century BC. The cohort itself emerged as an administrative unit conscripted from Rome's Italian allies and is first attested in a description by Polybius, a usually reliable historian, of a battle which occurred in 206 BC. By the 130s BC, through the Spanish wars and operations with Italian allies, the cohort had developed into a tactical unit. While, after 109 BC, the maniple disappears from the literary evidence, Marius' predecessor in Numidia is documented to have used cohorts in battle: if cohorts replaced maniples around this time, Marius was likely not responsible.

==== Land and citizenship for veterans ====
Modern historians have also attributed to Marius the development of the client armies, tying the loyalty of the veterans to generals securing land grants on discharge. This picture, however, is largely an exaggeration stemming from the lex agraria (c. 100 BC) distributing lands to Marius' veterans and poor Romans. No such client army can be seen in Marius' own land laws, which required cooperation from civil society – the senate, people, and other magistrates – and was not imposed by military decree.

Moreover, through the post-Marian period, land distributions were sporadic and volunteers were taken on with no promises or reasonable expectations of land at discharge. Soldiers both in the Marian and post-Marian periods largely went home peacefully when land demands were not immediately met, though land distributions became more common after Sulla's example in the aftermath of his civil war. Only during the civil wars during the later last century BC did demands for land become more prevalent, though not always explicitly to agrarian ends, due to the soldiers' increased bargaining power. For example, during Caesar's civil war (49–45 BC), mutineers demanded lands as a pretext for larger cash donatives, and only during the triumviral period (43–31 BC) did this pretext fall away.

There is also no evidence that Marius created or operated any system to give veterans Roman citizenship on discharge. Before the Social War there is only a single example of a citizenship grant for martial valour. Most scholars believe that grants of citizenship to veterans became common only under the emperor Claudius in the 1st century AD.

== Historiography ==
Modern historiography has regularly cast Marius as abolishing the propertied militia and replacing it with landless soldiers motivated largely by pay. This belief emerges from the ancient literary sources, but rests on a relatively weak basis.

Most scholars have now abandoned the belief that Marius was responsible for any proletarianisation of the Roman legions in the early 1st century BC and that such proletarianisation occurred at all, concluding that the reforms attributed to Marius are largely figments of modern historiography.

=== Ancient and 19th century views ===
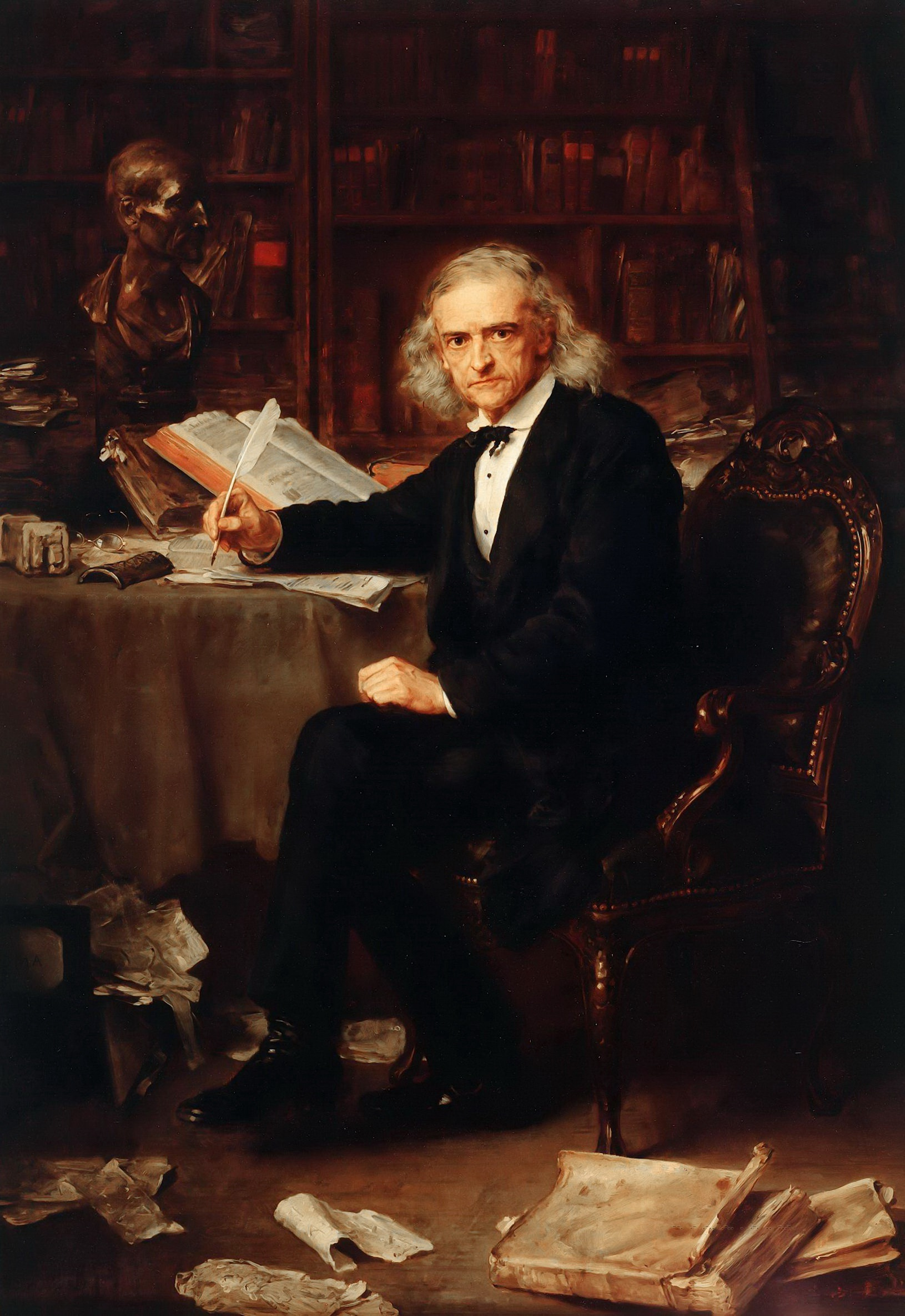
1881 painting of Theodor Mommsen, who spread the idea of Marian reforms, especially in terms of cohortal legions, state-purchased equipment, and volunteer enlistment

Ancient narratives on the Marian reforms largely discussed them in service of the respective narrative's themes. Sallust, the closest source to 107 BC, wrote a narrative lamenting moral decline among the citizenry. To that end, he portrayed Marius' enrolment in 107 in terms of his alleged ambition and disregard for ancestral customs:

[Marius] enrolled soldiers, not according to the classes in the manner of our forefathers, but allowing anyone to volunteer, for the most part the proletariat. Some say that he did this through lack of good men, others because of a desire to curry favour, since that class had given him honour and rank. As a matter of fact, to one who aspires to power the poorest man is the most helpful, since he has no regard for his property, having none, and considers anything honourable for which he receives pay.

Marius' open recruitment, as documented in Sallust, may also be explained not in terms of ambition but also by his desire to recruit as large an army as possible to send to Africa, to do so quickly, or to do so without harming his popularity. One of the other main sources is Valerius Maximus; he wrote, in a longer passage on the customs of the Roman army, that Marius disregarded its traditional recruitment practices due to his status as a novus homo, an aetiology which historians have dismissed as "puerile, naïve, and fanciful". Valerius Maximus' narrative is largely in the interest of creating exempla (moral parables) of traditions broken rather than conveying historical events.

Other sources, largely far later and dating from the Antonine period (2nd century AD), also associate Marius with allowing the capite censi to join in 107 BC: Plutarch, Florus, and Aulus Gellius. Plutarch's Life of Marius, depending on emendation, may claim that Marius enrolled slaves, which would be a profound exaggeration. Gellius' discussion indicates that there was some disagreement in the sources before him as to the year (during the Cimbric War in 104 or the Jugurthine War in 107 BC) in which Marius recruited the capite censi. However, other sources are entirely silent: for example, the abridgement of Livy's history entirely passes over the events from Marius' first consulship and Numidian command (108 – 105 BC), noting only that he was victor over Jugurtha, indicating that Livy or his epitomiser thought Marius' irregular levy unimportant. It is likely, however, that most of the ancient narratives which connected the collapse of the free state to the self-serving armed proletarian did so in the context of civil war. As literary themes, they were then retrojected into the time of Marius and the Jugurthine War, more than two generations earlier.

The first time a modern historian posited and attributed to Marius a revolutionary and comprehensive reform was in an 1846 book by the German scholar Ludwig Lange. The hypothesis rested on the assumption that any differences between the army of Marius' time and that of Polybius' time could be attributed to a single reform event of which Marius could have been the only progenitor.

The idea was spread by the influential 19th-century classicist Theodor Mommsen in the 1855 second volume of his The History of Rome, which served to bring the idea of the Marian reforms into the core of scholarship. It received more attention in the military historian Wilhelm Rüstow's 1857 book Geschichte der Infanterie ('History of the Infantry') which presented the Marian reforms – here conceived as a full overhaul including the abolition of the citizen cavalry, institution of a single form of heavy infantry, uniform equipment, and introduction of the cohort – as an established fact. However, he viewed it only as a step in the full professionalisation of the Roman army and believed that the putative reforms reflected real military needs.

Rüstow's views were largely repeated uncritically by authors including Joachim Marquardt and Theodore Ayrault Dodge. By the early twentieth century, two major overviews in German played a substantial role in also spreading these views. The first was by Hans Delbrück in 1900; the second was by Johannes Kromayer and Georg Veith in 1928. While both noted that there were no ancient sources which described any putative large-scale reforms by Marius, they both largely repeated previous scholarship that accepted the Marian reforms as a revolutionary turning point for the Roman army. From there, this view moved into reference works like the Realencyclopädie, and then into Anglophone scholarship via the highly cited 1928 overview The Roman Legions by Henry Michael Denne Parker. Only after the Second World War were these views re-examined.

=== Post-war critiques ===
The view inherited from the 19th century sources was challenged in two articles published in 1949 and 1951 by Emilio Gabba, an Italian historian, which held that instead of being a revolutionary change, Marius' decision to enrol the poor was the logical culmination of progressive reductions of the property qualifications in the face of chronic shortages of recruits. Marius' presumed reform then simply swept away the last vestige of a property qualification that by 107 BC had largely ceased to be binding.

In these terms, the abolition of the property qualification was just another stage in the evolution of the Roman army on the long journey to the professional army of the Augustan age. With no sources indicating that the social background of the legions had changed much, if at all, Gabba attributed the notability of the episode to Marius' political opponents' fear that voluntary service undermined traditional methods of gaining political support.

Later historians also downplayed these reforms. The French historian Jacques Harmand, writing in the 1960s, noted how the dilectus (lit. 'selection') of conscripts continued through the 2nd century into the late republic; this undermined the previous assumption that volunteer service became dominant after 107 BC. The British classicist Peter Brunt, in his 1971 book Italian Manpower, also questioned the extent to which Polybius' descriptions reflected the army of the mid-second century, noting that many aspects therein were notably archaic and only could have been true in the early third century BC. Gabba's posited property level qualifications and Brunt's attacks on Polybius' credibility broke one of the main assumptions of the 19th century German scholars, namely that the Polybian army persisted largely unchanged until Marius' time. Brunt also found no evidence that volunteers took over the legions and instead concluded that the adsidui raised by the traditional levy still dominated.

=== Contemporary historiography ===
The belief in the Marian reforms, by the late 20th century, largely rested on the argument that they reflected a manpower shortage. William Vernon Harris, an American classicist, showed in 1979 that complaints about conscription largely emerged only during campaigns which offered few prospects for plunder; this recast Marius' call in 107 BC for volunteers as reflecting less a dearth of soldiers but rather the relatively little plunder expected for service in Numidia. J W Rich then showed in a 1983 article in Historia that there was no general manpower shortage in Italy and that Marius' use of voluntary enlistment was in fact precedented, undermining the main proposed rationale for recruiting the proletarii. Further work on the demography of second-century Italy, especially by Nathan Rosenstein in the early 2000s, showed more definitively from the basis of archaeology there had been no population decline in the decades before Marius' first consulship, as had previously been believed.

François Cadiou, in his 2018 book L'armée imaginaire, largely disproved the traditional narrative that Marius' volunteers had a substantial impact on the composition of the army, that the late republic's armies were made up largely of volunteers, and that those armies were largely drawn from the landless poor. Cadiou, moreover, argued that historians' unwillingness to discard the theory that Marius decisively changed army recruitment, despite the limited evidence for it, emerged from the attractiveness of the theory as a simple explanation for the republic's collapse.

The changes to the Roman army during the 1st century BC are now more attributed to the Social War and the civil wars from 49 to 31 BC. After the Social War, the state also started to keep men under arms for longer periods to maintain available experienced manpower, and coupled this with longer terms for commanders, particularly Caesar and Pompey. Client armies emerged not in the 100s BC but rather in the decades before Caesar's civil war, which broke out in 49 BC. The large-scale downsizing of Roman cavalry detachments likely emerged from the extension of citizenship to all of Italy. Because Italy's enfranchisement meant that Rome was now directly liable for the cavalry's upkeep rather than their local communities, Rome instead levied auxilia from allies who, by treaty, were responsible for their contingents' upkeep.

Contrary to the traditional story of quiescent client armies following their generals, contemporary historiography has established that Roman soldiers during the civil wars needed to be convinced of the legitimacy of their generals' causes. For Sulla and Cinna, such appeals were rooted in the consuls' legitimacy and prerogatives given as a gift of the people. Client armies, instead of being a consequence of putative changes in recruitment, emerged from the prolonged civil wars – themselves fought between armies which believed they were defending the republic – and generals' attempts to secure military loyalty with pay increases.

== Bibliography ==
=== Modern ===
- Armstrong, Jeremy; Fronda, Michael P, eds. (2020). Romans at war: soldiers, citizens, and society in the Roman republic. Routledge. pp. 283–96. ISBN 978-1-138-48019-3.
  - Gauthier, François. "The transformation of the Roman army in the last decades of the Republic". In Armstrong & Fronda (2020), pp. 283–96.
  - Rosenstein, Nathan. "Epilogue". In Armstrong & Fronda (2020), pp. 297–307.
- Bishop, M. C. (2017). The Pilum: The Roman Heavy Javelin. Bloomsbury. ISBN 978-1-4728-1590-3.
- Cadiou, François (2018). L'armée imaginaire: les soldats prolétaires dans les légions romaines au dernier siècle de la République. Mondes anciens (in French). Paris: Les Belles Lettres. ISBN 978-2-251-44765-0.
- Evans, Richard John (1995). Gaius Marius: a political biography (PDF) (DLitt et Phil thesis). University of South Africa.
- Faszcza, Michał Norbert (2021). "Reformy Mariusza, czyli długie trwanie historiograficznego mitu". Res Historica (in Polish). 51: 13–42. doi:10.17951/rh.2021.51.13-42. hdl:20.500.12128/21768. ISSN 2082-6060. S2CID 237739140.
- Gauthier, François (2015). Financing war in the Roman republic: 201 BCE–14 CE (PhD thesis). McGill University.
- Goldsworthy, Adrian (2006) [2000]. The fall of Carthage: the Punic Wars 265–146 BC. London: Phoenix. ISBN 978-0-304-36642-2.
- Gruen, Erich (1995). The last generation of the Roman republic. Berkeley: University of California Press. ISBN 0-520-02238-6.
- Hornblower, Simon; et al., eds. (2012). The Oxford classical dictionary (4th ed.). Oxford University Press. ISBN 978-0-19-954556-8. OCLC 959667246.
  - Derow, P S. "census". In OCD^{4} (2012). doi:10.1093/acrefore/9780199381135.013.1466.
  - Lintott, A. "proletarii". In OCD^{4} (2012). doi:10.1093/acrefore/9780199381135.013.5361.
  - Treves, P; Cornell, T. "tumultus". In OCD^{4} (2012). doi:10.1093/acrefore/9780199381135.013.6603.
- Keaveney, Arthur (2007). The army in the Roman revolution. Routledge. ISBN 978-0-415-39486-4.
- Lavan, Myles (2019). "The army and the spread of Roman citizenship". Journal of Roman Studies. 109: 27–69. doi:10.1017/S0075435819000662. hdl:10023/18193. ISSN 0075-4358. S2CID 199951632.
- Lintott, Andrew (1994). "Political history, 149–95 BC". In Crook, J A; et al. (eds.). The last age of the Roman republic. Cambridge Ancient History. Vol. 9 (2nd ed.). Cambridge University Press. ISBN 0-521-25603-8.
- Mackay, Christopher S (2009). The breakdown of the Roman republic. Cambridge University Press. ISBN 978-0-521-51819-2.
- Matthew, Christopher (2010). "The Battle of Vercellae and the alteration of the heavy javelin (pilum) by Gaius Marius". Antichthon. 44: 50–67. doi:10.1017/S0066477400002070. ISSN 0066-4774. S2CID 145449944.
- Morstein-Marx, Robert (2011). "Consular appeals to the army in 88 and 87: the locus of legitimacy in late-republican Rome". In Beck, Hans; et al. (eds.). Consuls and res publica: holding high office in the Roman republic. Cambridge University Press. pp. 259–78. doi:10.1017/CBO9780511736124. ISBN 978-0-511-73612-4.
- Probst, Peter (2008). "Review of "The army in the Roman revolution"". Bryn Mawr Classical Review. ISSN 1055-7660.
- Rafferty, David (2021). "Review of "L'armée imaginaire: les soldats prolétaires dans les légions romaines au dernier siècle de la République"". Bryn Mawr Classical Review. ISSN 1055-7660.
- Rich, J W (1983). "The supposed Roman manpower shortage of the later second century BC". Historia: Zeitschrift für Alte Geschichte. 32 (3): 287–331. ISSN 0018-2311. JSTOR 4435854.
- Rosenstein, Nathan (2022). "Armies and political culture". In Arena, Valentina; Prag, Jonathan (eds.). A companion to the political culture of the Roman republic. Blackwell Companions to the Ancient World. Wiley Blackwell. pp. 236–47. ISBN 978-1-4443-3965-9. LCCN 2021024437.
- Scullard, H H (2011) [First published by Methuen & Co, 1959]. From the Gracchi to Nero: a history of Rome from 133 BC to AD 68. London and New York: Routledge Classics. ISBN 978-0-415-58488-3.
- Shochat, Yanir (1980). Recruitment and the programme of Tiberius Gracchus. Latomus. ISBN 978-2-87031-109-7.
- Taylor, Michael J (2019). "Tactical reform in the late Roman republic: the view from Italy". Historia: Zeitschrift für Alte Geschichte. 68 (1): 76–94. doi:10.25162/historia-2019-0004. ISSN 0018-2311. S2CID 165437350.
- Taylor, Michael J (2023). "Goodbye to all that: the Roman citizen militia after the great wars". In Balbo, Mattia; Santangelo, Federico (eds.). A community in transition: Rome between Hannibal and the Gracchi. Oxford University Press. pp. 146–64. ISBN 978-0-19-765524-5.

=== Ancient ===
- Plutarch (1920) [2nd century AD]. "Life of Marius". Parallel Lives. Loeb Classical Library. Vol. 9. Translated by Perrin, Bernadotte. William Heinemann. OCLC 40115288 – via LacusCurtius.
- Sallust (1921) [1st century BC]. "Bellum Iugurthinum". Sallust. Loeb Classical Library. Translated by Rolfe, John C. William Heinemann – via LacusCurtius.
- Valerius Maximus (2004). Memorable deeds and sayings: one thousand tales from ancient Rome. Translated by Walker, Henry. Indianapolis: Hackett. ISBN 0-87220-675-0. OCLC 53231884.
