= Maniple (military unit) =

Tactical unit of the Roman Republic

Maniple (Latin: manipulus; lit. 'a handful [of soldiers]') was a tactical unit of the Roman Republican armies, adopted during the Samnite Wars (343–290 BC). It was also the name of the military insignia carried by such units.

Maniple members, called commanipulares (sg.: commanipularis) were seen as each other's brothers-in-arms, but without the domestic closeness of the eight-man contubernium.

Cohorts replaced maniples as organisational units.

== History ==
The manipular system was adopted around 315 BC, during the Second Samnite War. The rugged terrain of Samnium, where the war was fought, was not conducive to the phalanx formation which the Romans had inherited from the Etruscans and Ancient Greeks. The main battle troops of the Etruscans and Latins of this period comprised Greek-style hoplite phalanxes, inherited from the original Greek phalanx military unit.

After suffering a series of defeats, culminating in the surrender of the entire army without resistance at Caudine Forks, the Romans abandoned the phalanx altogether, adopting the more flexible manipular system, famously referred to as "a phalanx with joints".

The manipular system was faded from ancient sources and was replaced by the cohort unit.

== Structure ==
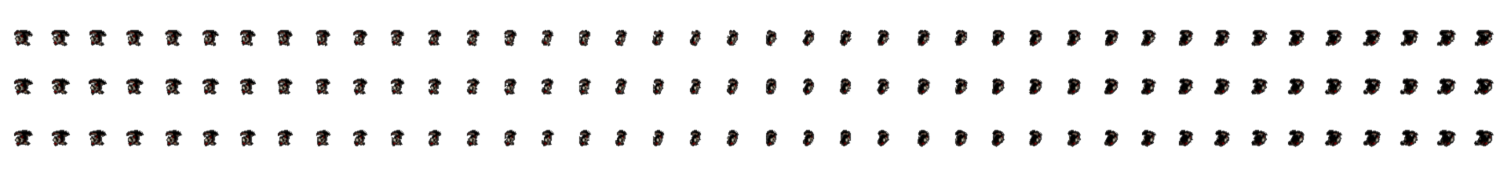
The maniple typically consisted of 120 soldiers arrayed in 3 ranks of 40 men when engaged in battle.

Polybius first described the maniple in the mid-2nd century BC. The manipular legion was organized into four lines, starting at the front: the velites; the hastati; the principes; and the triarii. These were divided by experience, with the younger soldiers at the front lines and the older soldiers near the back. One theory proposed by J. E. Lendon asserts that this order was adapted to the Roman culture of bravery, allowing an initial show of individual heroics among the younger soldiers.

At the front of the legion organized into maniples, the velites formed a swarm of soldiers which engaged the enemy at the start of the battle. Their duties involved skirmishing, and they often worked closely with the cavalry. Next, the hastati were the youngest and least experienced soldiers, and therefore fought on the front-lines. They formed the first line of heavy infantry. The principes were more experienced soldiers who stood behind the hastati in battle. Finally, the triarii were the veteran soldiers with the most experience.

The second and third echelon generally formed with a one maniple space between each maniple and its neighbours. Retreating troops of the velites could withdraw without disrupting those behind them. Where resistance was strong the hastati would dissolve back through the Roman line, allowing the more experienced soldiers in the principes to fight. In turn, the principes could then yield to the hardened triarii, if necessary. At this point in battle, the maniple greatly resembled the phalanx. Apart from allowing retreat, these gaps also proved invaluable against enemy phalanxes and provided the Romans with a major tactical advantage against their Greek foes. In order to maintain its wall of spears, the phalanx required rigid battle lines, which could not easily break into smaller units. Gaps in the maniples thus lured hoplites in and disrupted their formation, after which they became disorganized, surrounded, and easy prey for Roman swords.

According to Polybius, the most complete and likely the most accurate account, the legion consisted of 10 maniples of 120 hastati, 10 maniples of 120 principes, and 10 half strength maniples of triarii containing 60 men each. With 1,200 velites and 300 cavalrymen a legion numbered 4,500 men. However, in times of great need the number might be reinforced up to 5,000.

== Equipment ==
The echelons differed not only in their roles, but also in their equipment. Polybius describes their panoply in detail. First, the velites were armed with a sword, javelins, and a small shield called a parma. They wore no armor, apart from a helmet, which was often covered in animal skins. Polybius asserts that these skins not only protected the helmet, but also served as a means of identification, such that soldiers could be remembered and later rewarded for acts of bravery. Next, the hastati were armed in "full panoply." Their armament included a sword, javelins, and a large, reinforced shield. For armor, they wore a helmet decorated with tall plumes designed to make its wearer appear larger, as well as a sheet of metal called a "heart plate" to protect the chest. Principes were equipped in the same manner as the hastati. Wealthier soldiers (of a property value greater than 10,000 drachmas) could afford a chain-mail cuirass. Finally, the triarii were equipped like the other infantry, with the exception of a thrusting spear in place of javelins.

This equipment was generally lighter and cheaper than that of the Servian hoplites that preceded the maniple. It emphasized the flexibility of the maniple system and allowed for lightly armored, highly mobile soldiers. Moreover, because purchasing the equipment was the responsibility of the individual soldier, its affordability helped increase the number of citizens eligible for military service.

== Drill and fighting formations ==
No part of drill is more essential in action than for soldiers to keep their ranks with the greatest exactness, without opening or closing too much. Troops too much crowded can never fight as they ought, and only embarrass one another. If their order is too open and loose, they give the enemy an opportunity of penetrating. Whenever this happens and they are attacked in the rear, universal disorder and confusion are inevitable. Recruits should therefore be constantly in the field, drawn up by the roll and formed at first into a single rank. They should learn to dress in a straight line and to keep an equal and just distance between man and man. They must then be ordered to double the rank, which they must perform very quickly, and instantly cover their file leaders. In the next place, they are to double again and form four deep. And then the triangle or, as it is commonly called, the wedge, a disposition found very serviceable in action. They must be taught to form the circle or orb; for well-disciplined troops, after being broken by the enemy, have thrown themselves into this position and have thereby prevented the total rout of the army. These evolutions, often practised in the field of exercise, will be found easy in execution on actual service.

— Vegetius, De re militari I 26

== See also ==
- List of Roman army unit types
