= Heavy infantry =

Heavily armed and armoured soldiers

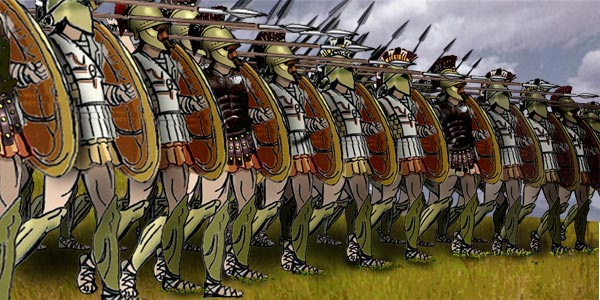
Heavy infantry hoplites of Ancient Greece in phalanx formation

Heavy infantry consisted of heavily armed and armoured infantrymen who were trained to mount frontal assaults and/or anchor the defensive center of a battle line. This differentiated them from light infantry who were relatively mobile and lightly armoured skirmisher troops intended for screening, scouting, and other tactical roles unsuited to soldiers carrying heavier loads. Heavy infantry typically made use of dense battlefield formations, such as shield wall or phalanx, multiplying their effective weight of arms with force concentration.

Heavy infantry were critical to many ancient armies, which first attested by the Sumerians in the Stele of the Vultures. It was also used by rival Assyrian and Persian Sparabara, then by Greek hoplites, Macedonian phalangites, and Roman legionaries. After the fall of Rome, heavy infantry declined in Europe but returned to dominance in the Late Middle Ages with Swiss pikemen and German Landsknechts. With the rise of firearms during early modern warfare, dense formations became increasingly infeasible, and heavy armours were either ineffective or too cumbersome to be tactically useful. By the early 18th century, heavy infantry were replaced by line infantry armed with muskets and bayonets and wearing little to no armour.

== History ==
=== Ancient Greece ===
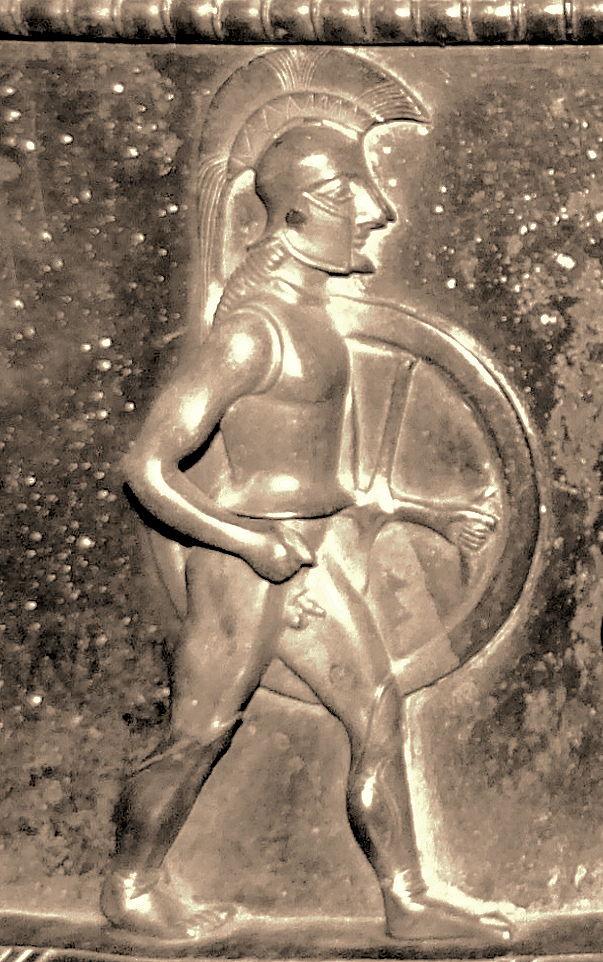
Probable depiction of a Spartan army hoplite (Vix crater, c. 500 BC)

In ancient Greece, the hoplite was a common form of heavy infantry. All hoplites had a shield and spear, and perhaps a helmet as well. Wealthier hoplites were able to afford bronze breastplate or linothorax armor, while poorer hoplites wore little to no armor. The hoplite armor and shield were designed to block arrows and blows from spear points and swords. Hoplites would act as both a city watch and as an army in the field. Hoplites were thought of as a force to be reckoned with because they would form a phalanx—a tight band of spearmen—which aided them against lighter infantry and cavalry.

=== Achaemenid Persia ===
Herodotus described an elite infantry unit of 10,000 soldiers, which he called the Immortals, in the army of the Achaemenid Empire. They were heavily armed, carrying wicker shields, short spears, quivers, swords or large daggers, and bow and arrow. Underneath their robes they wore scale armour coats, which means they were not "heavily-armored" (even by ancient standards), but on the other hand, this would allow them to carry more weapons. The regiment was followed by a caravan of covered carriages, camels, and mules that transported rations separate than that of the rest of the army.

=== Hellenistic successor states ===
Alexander's army employed infantry known as the phalangite – soldiers equipped with a small shield and long pike and employed in a formation known as the sarissa phalanx. Alexander also had a flexible heavy infantry force known as the Argyraspides, or silver shields, who acted as his elite infantry. Post-Alexander Hellenistic states such as Macedonia, Seleucid Persia, and Ptolemaic Egypt would employ more heavily armored phalangites, as well as their own variation of elite units such as the silver shields.

=== Celts ===
The Celts were a diverse group of people that, through migration, lived in an area stretching from the British Isles to Anatolia. A people with a strong warrior tradition, they varied greatly in battle and equipment. Some of the more heavily armed Celts wore mail armour and "Galea" type helmets, and threw javelins in battle; all of these elements were later adopted by the Romans. Celts were respected for their battle prowess and often served as mercenaries for other Mediterranean civilizations.

=== Rome ===
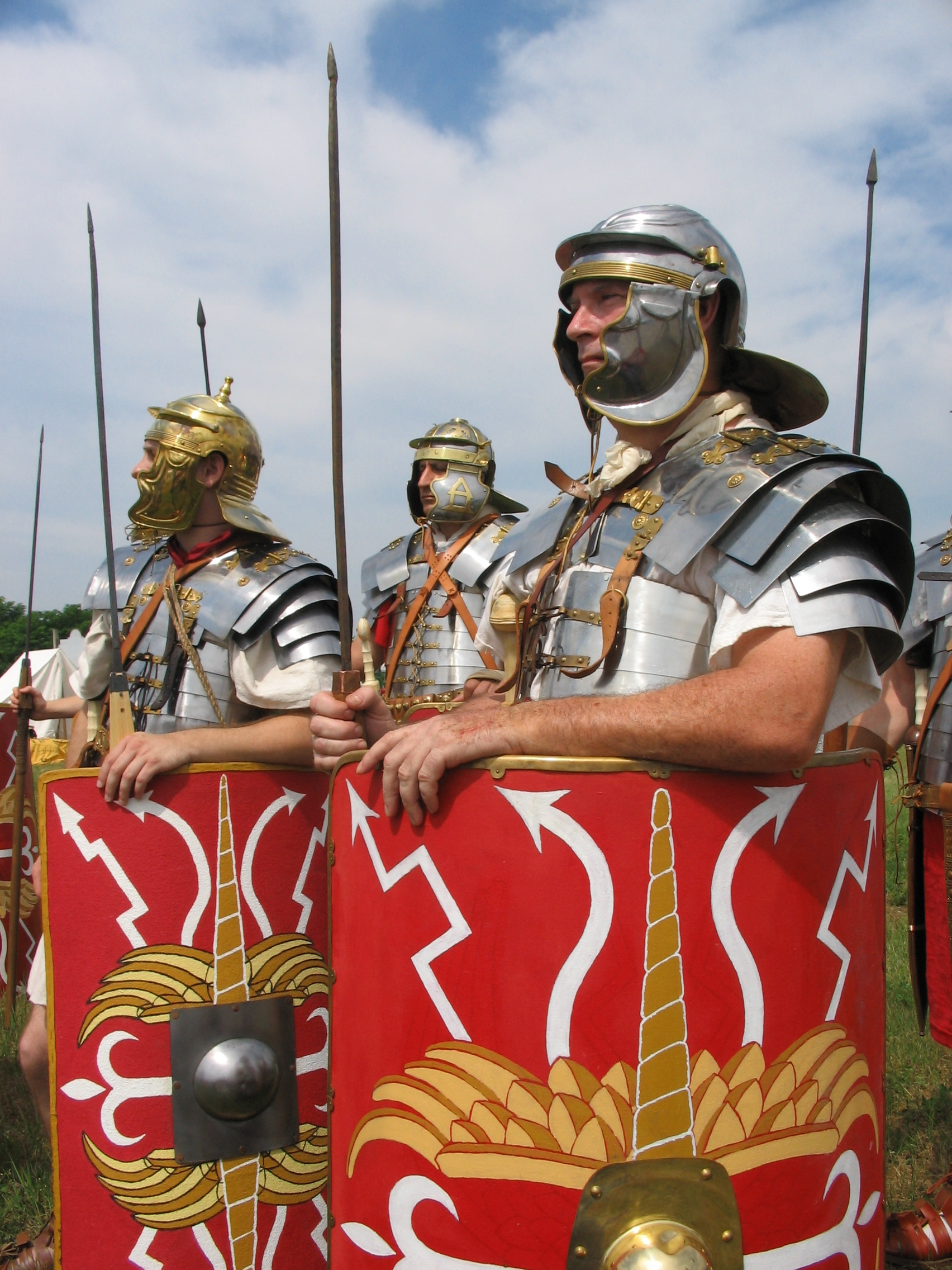
Re-enactors depicting Roman legionaries wearing the lorica segmentata, 1st–3rd century. Other equipment in view include the galea (helmet), pilum (spear) and scutum (shield)

In the military of ancient Rome, heavy infantry made up most of the Roman army. The heavy infantry of the pre-Marian Roman Republic included the hastati, principes, and triarii (although depending how the hastati were armed and armored, they could also be considered light infantry). The hastati, the youngest men in the line, were armed with a sword, or gladius, and two javelins, or pila. The pila were usually thrown at a charging enemy before they were engaged in hand-to-hand combat. Hastati were also equipped with a helmet, a shield and a bronze breast plate or coat of mail (if they could afford it). The principes were armed just like the hastati, but they were older, more experienced and, because they had more money, were more likely to own better-quality arms.

The final type of heavy infantry were the triarii. They were armed and armored just like the principes except that instead of wielding a sword or gladius, they used a large spear known as the hasta. Incidentally, the hastati were originally armed with this weapon, which gave them their name, but the hasta were eventually abandoned as Rome switched from a Greek-style hoplite phalanx to the manipular system. The triarii were the last vestige of this older style of warfare in the Roman republic. The triarii were usually called in to end the battle and break the lines of the enemy.

Rome's use of heavy infantry and a general lack of major cavalry forces meant they were stronger in pitched battle but more vulnerable to ambushes. After the late 2nd century BCE, the three-lined maniples were replaced in favor of a single type of heavy infantry, the legionary, all equipped in nearly identical fashion to hastati and principes.

=== Early Imperial East Asia ===
Following the introduction of infantry tactics during the Warring States period, the Qin army developed an infantry force that would help it conquer the other states. Soldiers fulfilling the role of heavy infantry usually wore lacquered leather (and sometimes bronze) coat of plate or lamellar armour, and were equipped with spears and wooden shields, halberds, dagger-axes, swords, and small and large shields covered in metal. Some soldiers were also equipped with very long spears, long halberds, or pikes, and fought in a formation akin to Swiss pikemen. The Han dynasty that succeeded the Qin era equipped their soldiers with iron armor, which they were able to mass-produce because of state standardized metallurgical improvements. Unlike their contemporaries such as the post-Marian Romans, the Han military did not rely primarily on their heavy infantry but emphasized a more balanced force of infantry, missile troops, and cavalry.

The kingdom of Goguryeo in Korea was renowned for its military power and influence, especially during the rule of Gwanggaeto the Great. The rapid expansion of Goguryeo into Manchuria and parts of eastern China can be accredited to the skill and discipline of the Goguryeo heavy infantry and cavalry. Soldiers were typically equipped with iron swords, polearms, and bows. Warriors were usually clad in iron lamellar armor or lacquered leather to ward off arrows and sword blows. The weapons and armor of the heavy infantry of Goguryeo were considered the best in quality because of the advanced technological improvements made in steel and iron production in Korea. Not much is known about the actual battle formations used in Korean armies during the Goguryeo era, but accounts of the individual expertise and prowess of the Goguryeo soldiers, as well as the strict regimentation of Goguryeo's armies, indicates that there must have been some balance between group combat and individual combat. Despite strides made in infantry warfare, Goguryeo also placed great emphasis on the usage of heavy cavalry, sometimes almost exclusively using horsemen for shock attacks, with infantrymen coming in after the initial cavalry charge. Meticulous development and implementation of efficient swordsmanship and martial arts, tactics, and technology allowed Goguryeo armies to remain virtually undefeated during the height of its existence.

=== Middle Ages ===
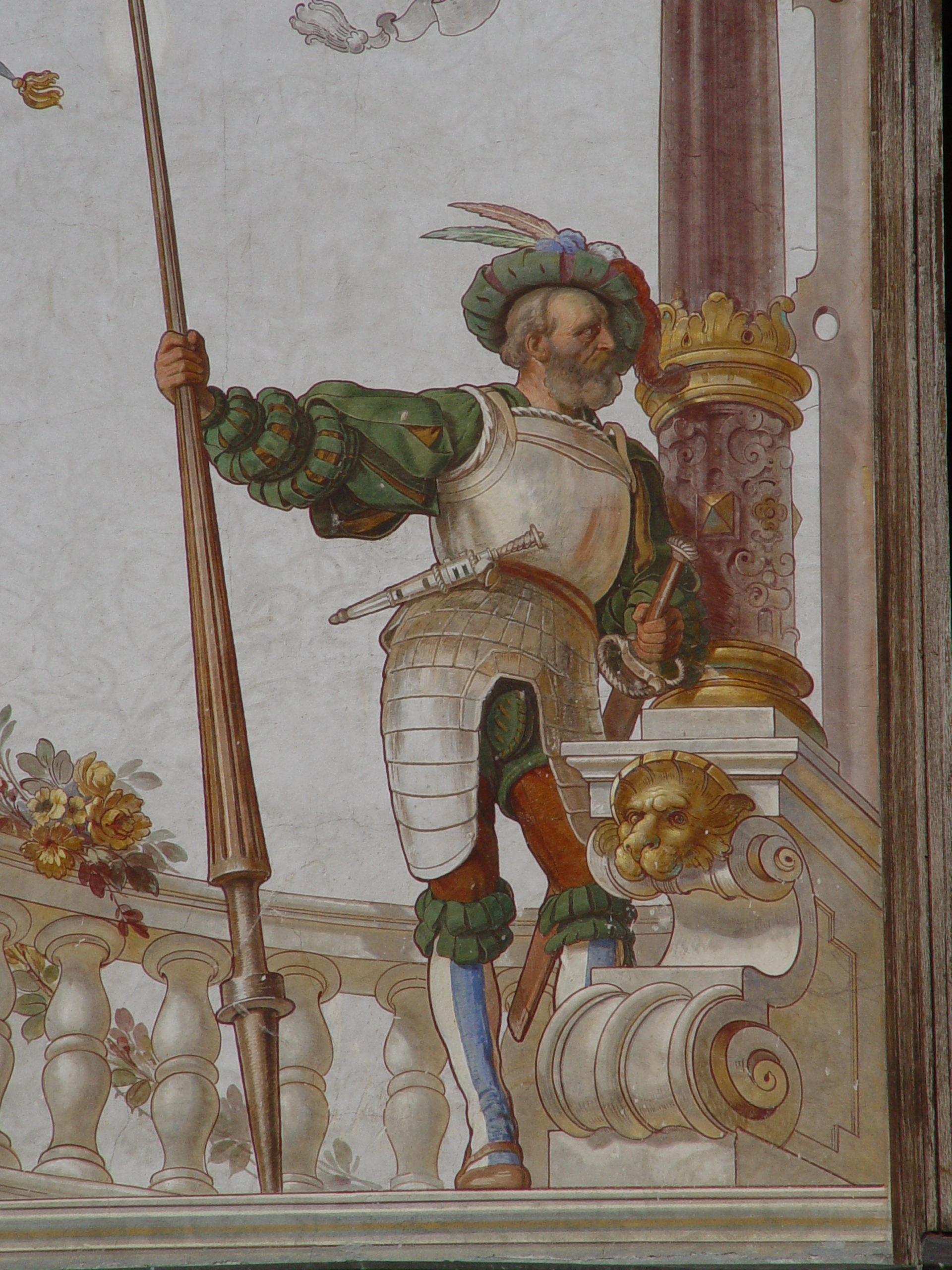
Painting of a Landsknecht in Peleș Castle

The Swiss reinvented heavy infantry during the Late Middle Ages to counter heavy cavalry. Swiss pikeman militia formations resembled ancient Greek warfare and hoplite forces. Despite similarities with Greek phalanx formation, the Swiss showed more offensive posture during battles. The Swiss soldiers wore only steel caps and breastplates for protection. They were armed with halberds, which allowed footmen to pull cavalry soldiers from their mounts. The Swiss used drums to control formations. One additional factor that lessened heavy cavalry's role on the battlefield, despite innovations such as the stirrup, were the inventions of the longbow and the crossbow after the eleventh century. However, the Swiss did not manage to form an effective counter to heavy cavalry until the mid-fourteenth century. By the late fourteenth century the Swiss tactics started to dominate warfare. German, French and Spanish militaries incorporated Swiss mercenaries and adopted their heavy infantry tactics. The Swiss innovations continued to influence early Renaissance period.

== See also ==
- Light infantry
- Mechanized infantry in modern times
- Heavy cavalry
- Light cavalry
- Roman infantry tactics, strategy and battle formations
