= Dolabra =

Ancient Roman pickaxe-like tool

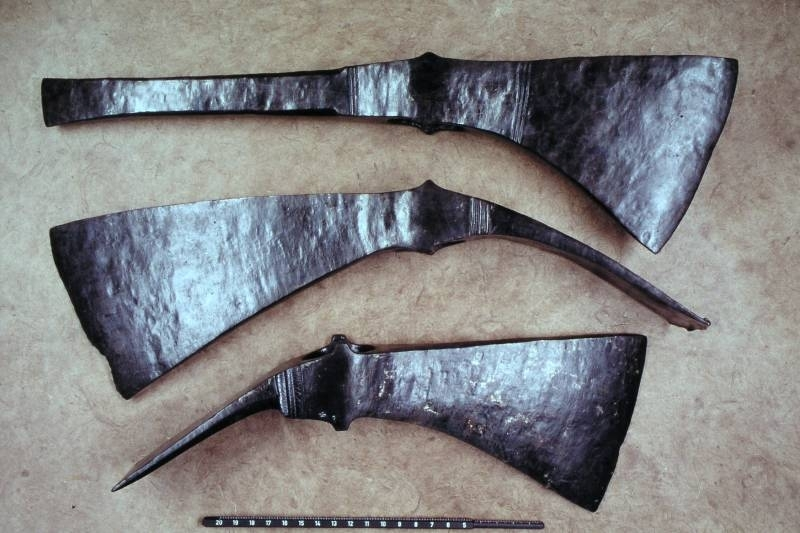
Early Roman Dolabra.

The dolabra is a versatile axe used by the people of Italy since ancient times. The dolabra could serve as a pickaxe used by miners and excavators, a priest's implement for ritual religious slaughtering of animals and as an entrenching tool (mattock) used in Roman infantry tactics. In the 1st century CE, at the Siege of Augustodunum Haeduorum, armoured Gallic gladiators were defeated by legionaries wielding dolabrae.

According to Frontinus, Gnaeus Domitius Corbulo was fond of saying, "you defeat the enemy with a pickaxe".

== See also ==
- Entrenching tool
- Digging stick
- Pulaski

== General and cited references ==
- Adrian Goldsworthy, The Complete Roman Army.
- Strauss, Barry S. The Spartacus War. Simon & Schuster, 2009.
