= Elogium (literary genre) =

Inscription of honour for the deceased

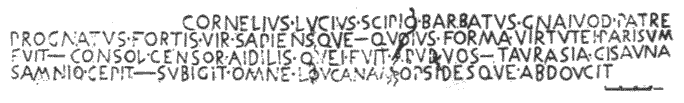
Rubbing of the Elogium on the tomb of Scipio Barbatus, Rome

An elogium (Latin, plural: elogia) was an inscription in honour of a deceased person, which was placed on tombs, ancestral images and statues during the Roman age. The elogia are sometimes synonyms with the tituli, the identifying inscriptions on wax images of deceased ancestors that were displayed in the atrium of the domus of noble families, but they are shorter than the laudatio funebris, the funeral oration. Originally, the text was usually written in saturnians, but later it could be in hexameters, iambic hexameters, distichs or in prose. Characteristic of the elogium is the nominative case used for the name of the deceased and not, as it was the case later in the funerary literature, the dative.

In the imperial period, the elogium became a literary genre: texts were collected by Marcus Terentius Varro and Titus Pomponius Atticus, and writing elogia on famous deceased persons became a popular rhetorical exercise. The elogia on the statues of the Temple of Mars Ultor at the Forum of Augustus are said to have been written by Augustus himself.

== Etymology ==
There are several hypotheses about the origin of the word ēlŏgium. The most immediate one is a derivation from the Latin verb eligere ("to select"); in this case then an elogium would be a 'selection' from the records of the family archives; other etymologies are: from eloquium; from the root rag 'to collect, to read' would have meant 'saying, aphorism'; from a root lag (to legere) the meaning would have been 'saying, praise saying, thought saying'. It could also possibly be a loan word from Greek ἐλεγεῖον, originally a distich epigram, or from εὐλογία. The latter derivation would explain the alternative spelling eulogium. The word, which originally meant "praise", during the Imperial age got the additional meaning of "a sentence", as official police reports, criminal court rulings, or brief descriptions of medical conditions. The oldest uses of the word in literature are in Plautus and in Cato, and follow Greek models.

== History ==
Its first usage is in the meaning 'inscription': this happens already in Plautus and in Cato. Otherwise, the term was mainly used for grave inscriptions on very ancient family burials or for the tituli of the ancestral images placed in the atrium of a Roman domus.

=== Elogia as funerary writings ===
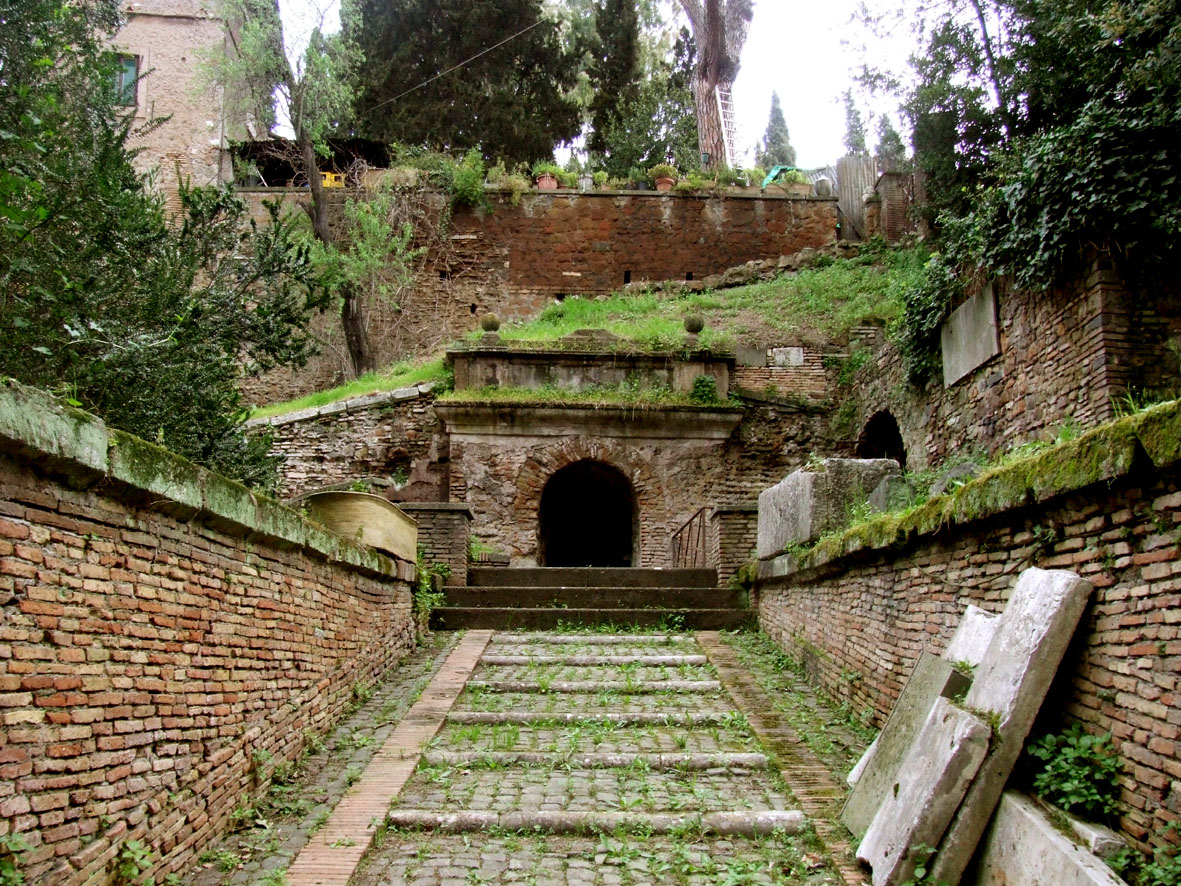
Entrance to the tomb of the Scipios, Rome

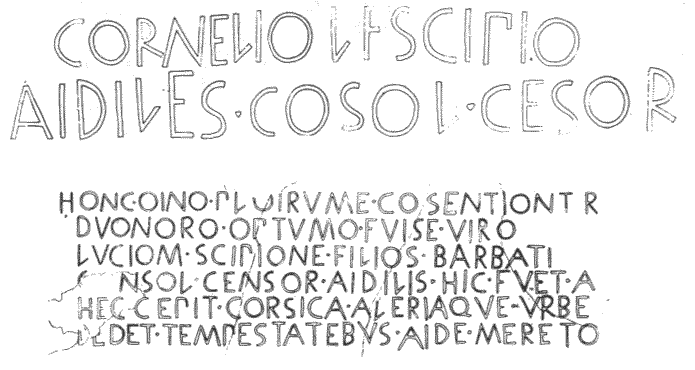
Rubbing of the Elogium on the tomb of Lucius Cornelius Scipio found in the Tomb of Scipios

From the end of the 5th century BC onwards, probably in imitation of a Greek custom, the elogia were poetic epigrams with praising mention of dignities and victories, first in saturnine verses, later in hexameters. The name of the deceased (in nominative case) and these of their curule offices were painted with minium, like the tituli of the imagines maiorum. Thus here one can already find the same two components (image and dignities) typical of the elogia of the Augustus Forum.

At the beginning, as cited by Cicero, the funerary elogium was a short poem in saturnine verses praising the virtues of the deceased. Augustus wrote such an epitaph in verse as an inscription on the tomb of his adoptive son Drusus (died 9 BC). In the Tomb of the Scipios, a republican funerary monument on the Appian Way, funerary inscriptions on the sarcophagi of the Scipions can be considered elogia. The elogia of the Scipios, composed later than 240 BC, are in saturnian metre, in archaic Latin, and show the increasing Hellenisation of Roman society. In fact, alongside the typically Roman values of Virtus and physical strength, those of beauty and wisdom, representative of the Greek culture, appear. Below is the elogium of Lucius Cornelius Scipio, son of Lucius Cornelius Scipio Barbatus, whose elogium is also extant:

HONC·OINO·PLOIRVME CONSENTIONT·R[OMANE]
DVONORO·OPTVMO FVISE·VIRO
LVCIOM·SCIPIONE. FILIOS·BARBATI
CONSOL·CENSOR·AIDILIS HIC·FVET·A[PVD VOS]
HEC·CEPIT·CORSICA ALERIAQUE·VRBE
DEDET·TEMPESTATEBVS AIDE·MERETO [D.]

In Rome, very many people recognise
that he alone was among the good citizens the best,
Lucius Scipio. Son of Barbatus,
was Consul, Censor and Aedile at your side.
He took Corsica and the city of Aleria,
consecrated a temple to the Tempests, as a just return.

From the 6th century BC onward, the same custom became more widespread – especially among the half-hellenized populace. Since the end of the Republic, the epigraphy of the tombs distanced itself more and more from the model of the old elogium; the sepulchral inscriptions, also among the noble circles, appear increasingly as dedications to the deceased, so that their names are written in the dative case.

Around 39 BC Marcus Terentius Varro published a work in 15 books entitled Imagines or hebdomades containing a literary copy of the old sepulchral elogia. In this work were contained – as far as the preserved fragments indicate – the poetic signatures of the portraits of 700 famous personalities from all regions, Greeks as well as Romans, called epigrammata or elogia. Three elogia from Varro's work dedicated to famous poets, Gnaeus Naevius, Plautus and Pacuvius, which are extant, derive from real funeral orations.

=== Elogia on the ancestral images (imagines) ===
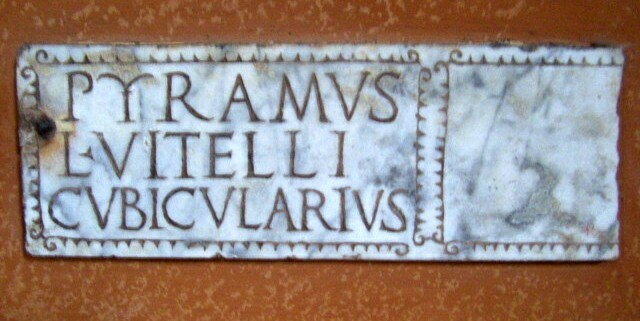
Titulus of Pyramus, the cubicularius of Lucius Vitellius the elder. Found in Rome, ref. CIL VI, 37786 = AE 1910, 00029

Early on, the families of the higher nobility started to hang the pictures of the ancestors ("imagines") with curulic offices on the walls of the atrium and to connect them with painted lines to form family trees ("stemmata"). The inscriptions under the individual portraits are usually called tituli. These tituli or elogia probably corresponded in form to the oldest funerary inscriptions, but without the poetic additions. They only contained the name in the nominative case, the curulic offices (to which other magistracies were added later) and the high priesthoods, as well as eventual triumphs; nothing more could not be inserted because of the limited space; people interested in other details could ask to read the commentarii in the family archives.

=== Elogia on public monuments of the Republican period ===
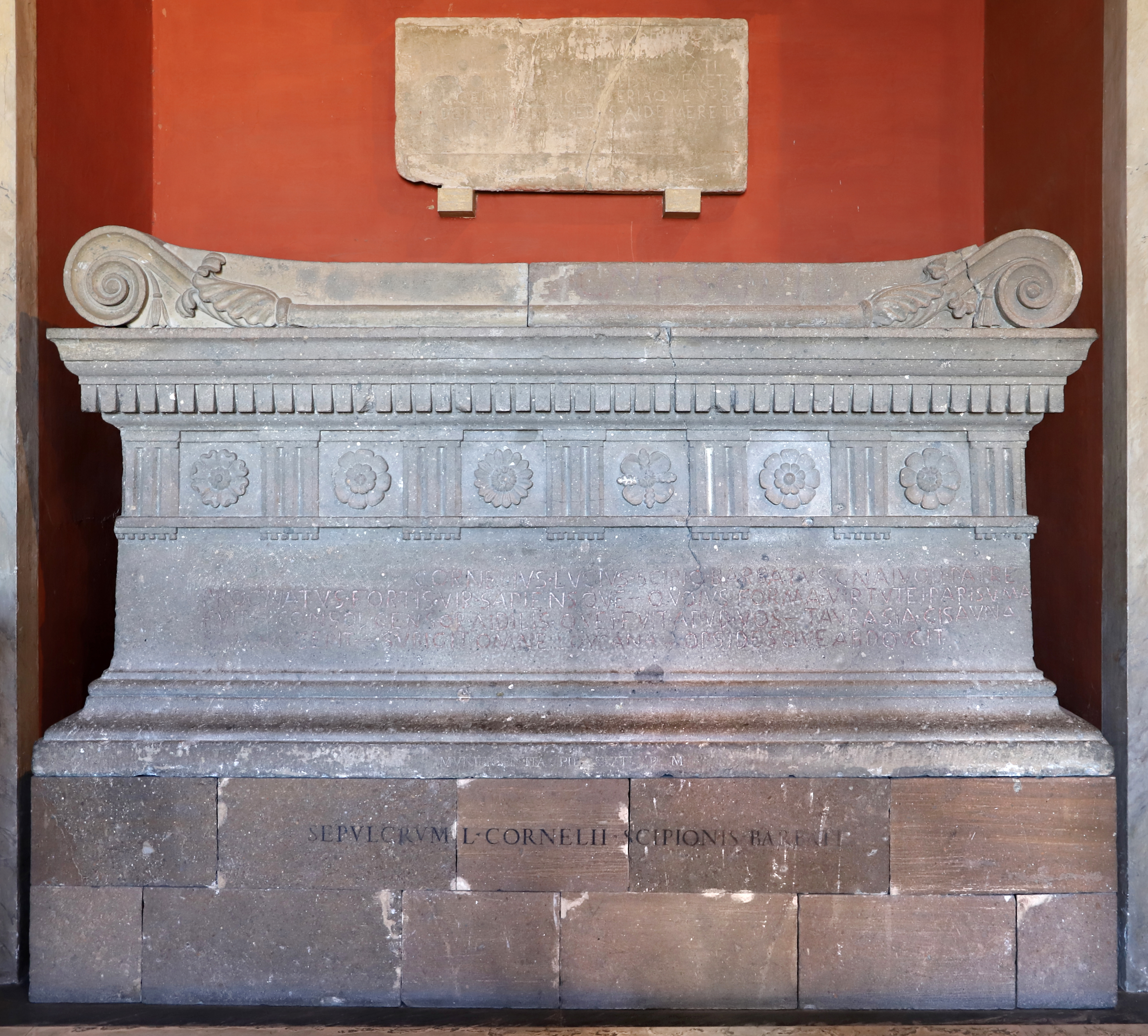
Sarcophag of Lucius Cornelius Scipio Barbatus with his elogium in saturnian metre above it

Already in the early Roman Republic patrician families hanged imagines with the corresponding tituli or elogia not at home anymore, but in public spaces too. Sponsors of sacred and state buildings often had the portraits of their ancestors with inscriptions affixed to these works. Appius Claudius Caecus (consul 307 and 296 BC) did so on the temple of Bellona, which he erected in 296 BC. Marcus Aemilius Lepidus, consul in 78 BC, did the same both in the Basilica Aemilia built by his ancestors and in his own house. Quintus Caecilius Metellus Pius Scipio (consul in 52 BC) had a whole crowd of gilded equestrian statues of his ancestors erected at a building on the Capitol. Elogia in the Republican age were not confined to Rome. Among others, on the acropolis of Tarquinii have been excavated fragments of elogia of local citizens, useful for shedding light on the Etruscan aristocracy.

=== The Elogia on the Forum of Augustus in Rome ===
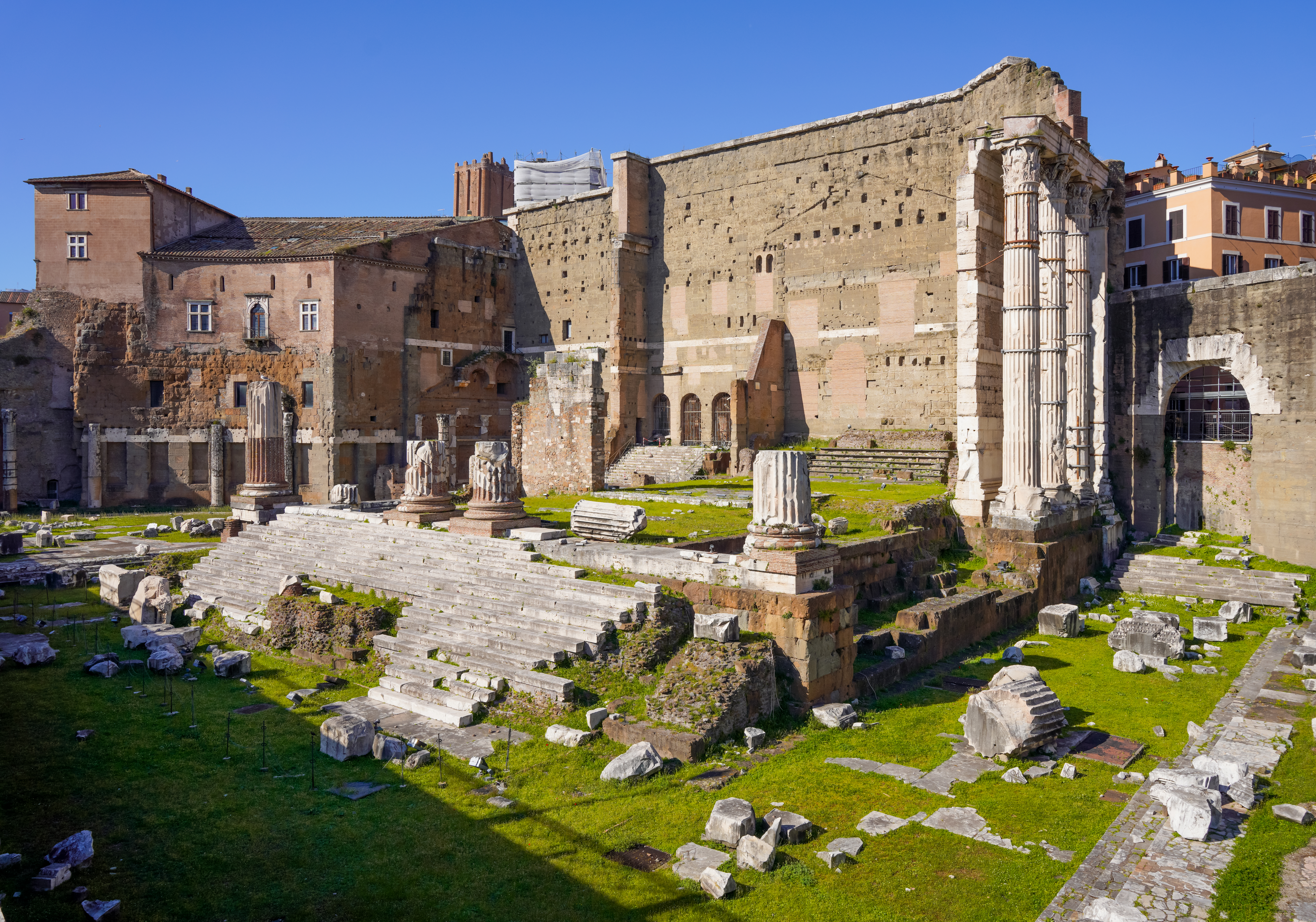
Temple of Mars Ultor in the Forum of Augustus in Rome

All the elogia types described above have in common the mention of the name in the nominative and the enumeration of the offices; however, by the sepulchral elogia the deeds of the deceased are present, while these are missing in the elogia of the imagines. Moreover, only the latter are regularly linked to a portrait. Both types of these elogia usually occur in groups representing the ancestors of a patrician family. In the late Republic, by the Imagines of Varro and Atticus, are described elogia which contains connection to a portrait, indication of name and offices and enumeration of gesta. moreover, these elogia are wider in scope, not limiting themselves to a family, but describing series of celebrities from different areas. This type of elogia first appears in monuments in the time of Augustus.

Emperor Augustus adorned his forum, dedicated in 2 BC, with statues of famous Romans of the past bearing inscriptions referring to their offices and deeds. These have been partly preserved and in modern epigraphy bear the technical name elogia. The images were hosted in niches (some of which still existent) placed along the two semicircular exedra on the east and west sides of the forum. Each elogium was divided into two parts; the name and the office held were indicated on the plinth of the statue; in the marble cladding of the wall, which lay a little lower, a short outline of the public (mostly military) activity of the celebrated person was carved on larger, framed panels. The total number of statues with elogia on the forum is unknown, and neither the architecture of the site nor other considerations can give any hint on that.

A similar arrangement in the elogia can be found in the Basilica Aemilia, a civil basilica in the nearby Roman Forum. From literary sources and fragments we know that among those depicted were Aeneas and the numerous Albanian kings as ancestors of the Julian house, furthermore Marcus Valerius Corvus (tribunus militum in 349 BC) and Scipio Aemilianus (consul in 147 BC). Only a few reliable fragments have survived of the original inscriptions from the Forum of Augustus. Moreover, has been proved that several elogia found outside the site are more or less faithful copies of those from the Forum of Augustus. In particular, some pieces comes from Rome itself and a whole series of seven from Arretium; probably at least two elogia each from Lavinium and Pompeii, as well as fragments from Carthage. On the whole, we now know twenty of the personages of Roman history which have been celebrated by elogia: Aeneas, Lavinia, Aeneas Silvius, Romulus, Manius Valerius Maximus Dictator (consul in 494 BC), Marcus Furius Camillus (tribunus militum in 401 BC), Lucius Albinius (unknown), Marcus Valerius Corvus (consul in 348 BC), Lucius Papirius Cursor (dictator in 325 BC), Appius Claudius Caecus (consul in 307 BC), Gaius Duilius (consul in 260 BC), Quintus Fabius Maximus (consul in 233 BC), Lucius Cornelius Scipio Asiaticus (consul in 190 BC), Lucius Aemilius Paullus (consul in 182 BC), Tiberius Sempronius Gracchus (consul in 177 BC), Publius Scipio Aemilianus (consul in 147 BC), Quintus Caecilius Metellus Numidicus (consul in 109 BC), Gaius Marius (consul in 107 BC), Lucius Cornelius Sulla Felix (consul in 88 BC) Lucius Licinius Lucullus (consul in 74 BC).

Augustus chose the personalities to honour in his forum according to two criteria: since in the Forum had been erected a temple of Mars Ultor, and the god had a double role, both as progenitor of the Gens Julia and as god of war and triumph, he honoured both historical and mythical personalities linked to the gens Iulia (including at least a woman, Lavinia) and Romans who had distinguished themselves in warlike enterprises. The plan of the forum also envisaged that personalities who in the future had distinguished themselves in warfare would have their bronze statue with the respective elogium erected in the square. However, the emperor himself was not celebrated in the forum with an elogium.

=== The Elogia during the Imperial age ===
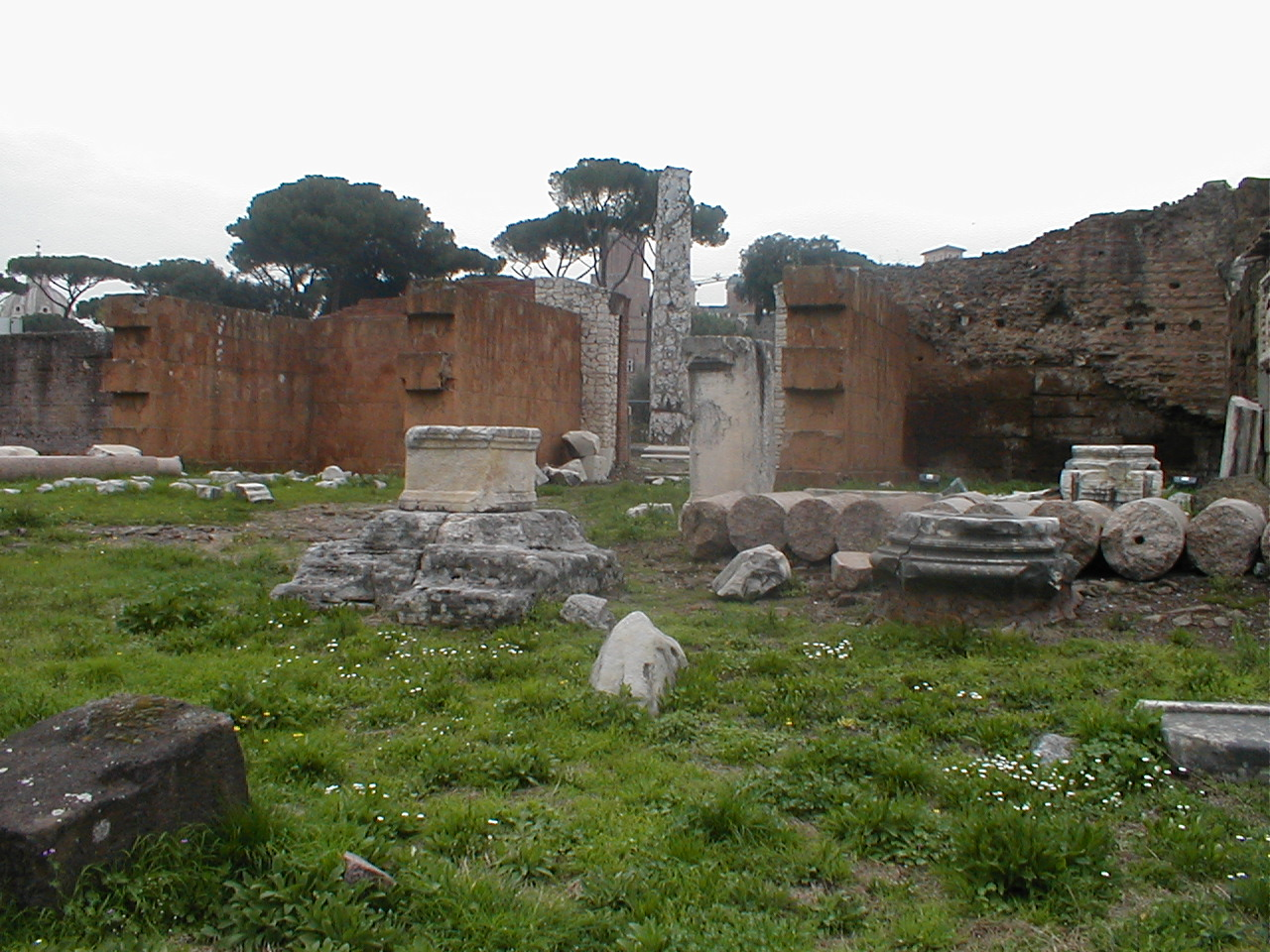
The remains of Basilica Aemilia in the Roman Forum. Images of ancestors of Aemilius Lepidus with their respective elogia adorned the republican building

The series of elogia begun by Augustus was continued in Rome on his Forum in the imperial period. Here each general honoured with a triumph or the ornamenta triumphalia got a statue, but the associated inscription used the dative of the name instead of the nominative. Moreover, the elogium did not mention all the gesta, but only those determining the award of the insignia of the triumph and its decree by the senate. During the early imperial period Rome and its surroundings were dotted with statues of illustrious men and women of the Republic bearing an elogium. The Basilica Aemilia on the Forum Romanum, which Marcus Aemilius Lepidus (consul in 78 BC), had already decorated with the images of his ancestors on clupei with tituli, was adorned (possibly by Augustus) with the images of war heroes who were related to Lepidus and Augustus. Several fragments of the elogia related to these portrayals, in which – following the pattern of the Forum of Augustus – the name and cursus honorum were separated from the gesta, have survived. The elogia were not limited to warriors: public and private libraries were also adorned with portraits of orators and writers, which bore elogia. Also in these cases by the honorific inscription the nominative case was soon replaced by the dative.

At the turn of the second century, Pliny the Younger mentions in a letter verses which are related to elogia of his friend Titinius Capito. It is possible that they came from imagines in Capito's private collection, but also from a book. It is also extant a series of 24 elogia, each consisting of six lines, named Carmina de viris illustribus Romanis, where, among others, heroes of liberty such as Cato Uticensis and the Caesarian centurion Cassius Scaevus have been celebrated. Finally, during the later Empire should be mentioned the verses on distinguished contemporaries by Symmachus (praefectus urbis in 384-385), which follow the model of the elogia in Varro's Hebdomades.

== Sources ==
- Uwe Neumann (1994). "Elogium I.". In Gert Ueding (ed.). Historisches Wörterbuch der Rhetorik (in German). Vol. 2. Berlin: De Gruyter. pp. 1086–1088. ISBN 3-484-68102-0.
- "Elogium (1)". Paulys Realencyclopädie der classischen Altertumswissenschaft (in German). Vol. 5. Leipzig: Georg Wissowa. 1905. pp. 2440–2452.
