= Homeric shield from Dura-Europos =

Roman artifact (3rd century CE)

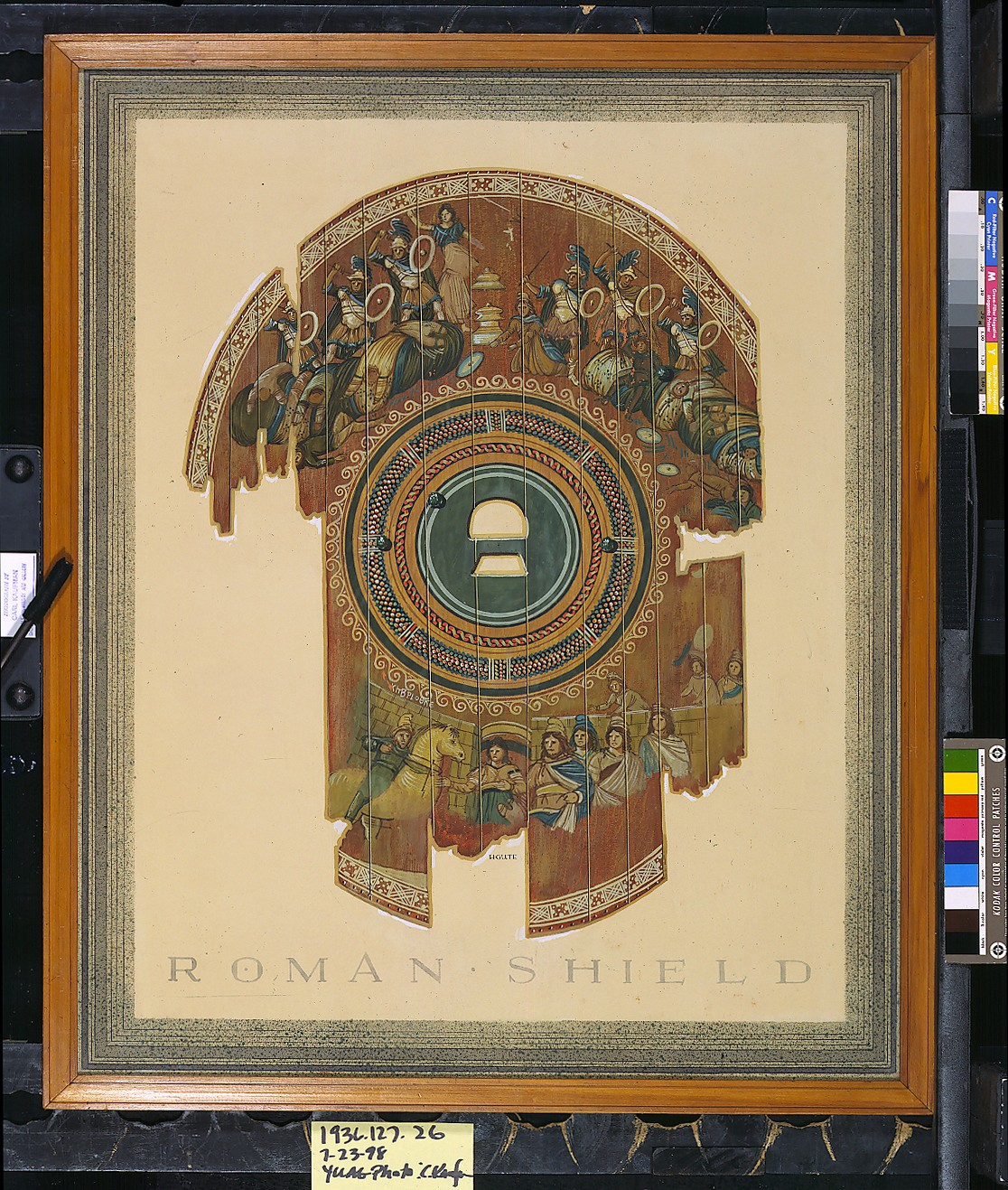
Herbert J. Gute's watercolor of the Homeric shield

The Homeric shield is one of three figural painted shields found together in an embankment within a Roman garrison during the excavations of Dura-Europos. Dura-Europos was a border city of various empires throughout antiquity, and in modern archaeology is noteworthy for its large amount of well-preserved artifacts. Having been virtually untouched for centuries, and with favorable soil, an unusual amount of organic material has been preserved at Dura-Europos. This shield and those found alongside it date from the middle of the 3rd century CE, a period in which a large portion of the city was co-opted as a Roman military base. The shields were deliberately discarded unfinished during the Sassanian siege of Dura Europos. It is widely believed to depict two scenes from the Trojan war: the admission of the Trojan horse into Troy, and the subsequent sack of the city. It is one of few examples of Roman painting on wood, and one of very few Roman painted wooden shields to have survived from antiquity. The shield has now deteriorated beyond most detail being discernible to the naked eye. This is due to the unintended adverse effects of a binding agent applied to the shield in the 1930s in the hopes of preserving the pigmentation.

== Discovery ==
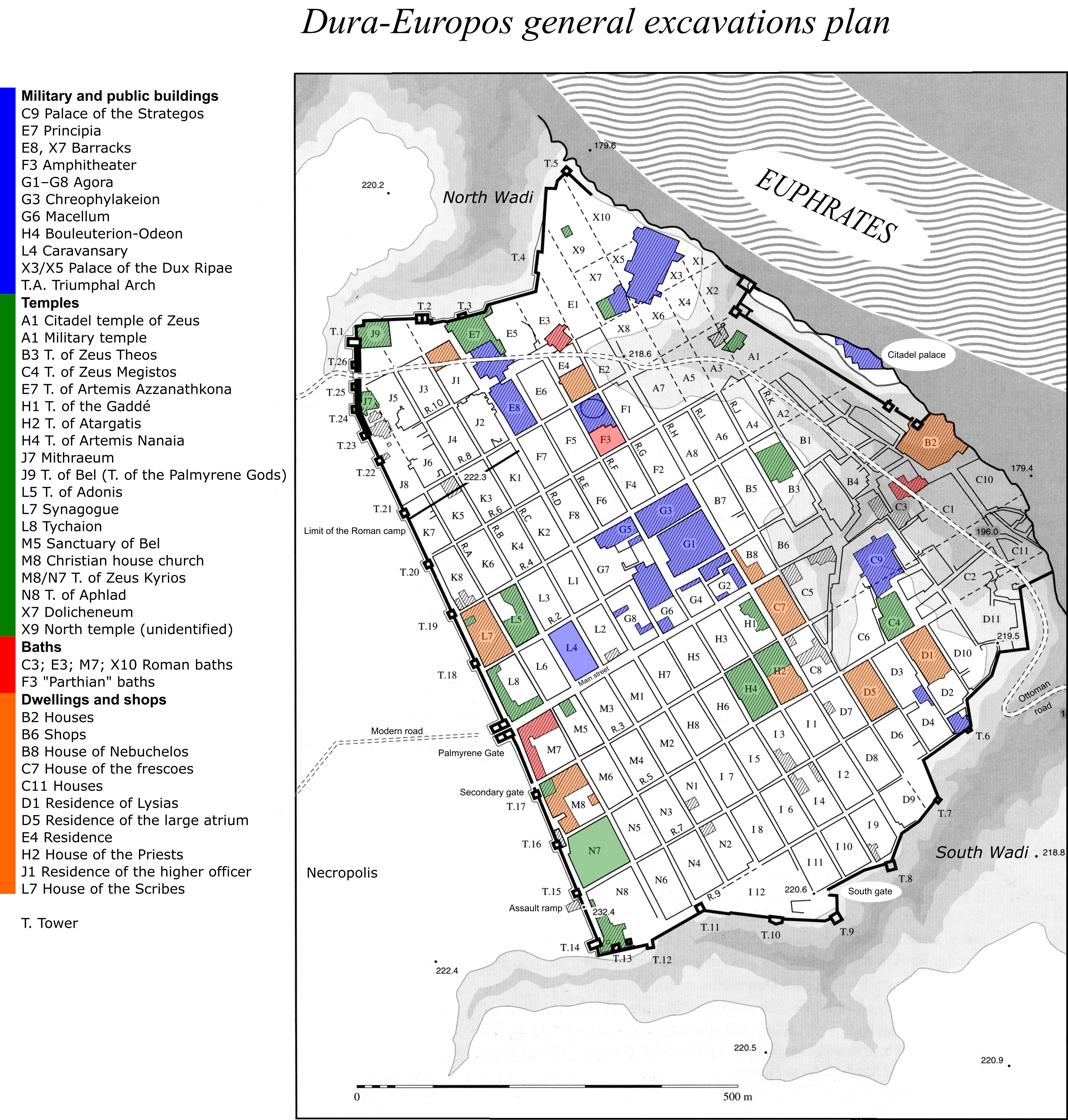
The excavation map of Dura-Europos. Tower 24, in the top left, was the find location of the shield.

In the 1920s and 30s, Yale University and the French Academy held joint excavations of Dura-Europos, after the modern rediscovery of the site initiated with the widely published photos and findings of James Henry Breasted. The 8th season of excavation, in the winter months of 1934 and 1935, was under the directorship of Clark Hopkins. The excavation was significantly shorter than the others, due to the depreciation of the American dollar and the expense of transporting the walls of the synagogue. A division of the workforce, under Frank E. Brown, dug in the northwest quarter of the city, which had become a Roman garrison in the late second and early third centuries. During the closing months of the 8th season, it was presumably this division that found the Homeric shield, along with two other shields, referred to in the preliminary report of the excavations as the "Amazon shield" and "Warrior God shield". The shields were buried in an embankment created to shore up the city walls during the Sassanian siege of the city. The shields were discovered in a portion of the embankment located in Tower 24, near the site of the Mithraeum.

The three shields were in impressively good condition upon discovery since they were found tightly pressed on top of one another, but the paintings were still faint and illegible in areas. Further, the wood was still very delicate, and even though there were geometric designs on the reverse sides of all the shields, at the time it was judged not worth the risk to the objects to attempt to turn them. The expedition artist, Herbert Gute, took responsibility for transporting and cleaning the shields, and on-site painted detailed watercolor reproductions of them. The shields garnered a significant amount of media attention, with both London Illustrated News (in an article by Hopkins) and Fortune publishing Gute's watercolors. The major finds of the seventh and eighth seasons were split between Yale and the Syrian government. Syria claimed the painted walls of the synagogue, and Yale claimed the walls of the Mithraeum and the painted shields. The shield was ultimately transported to Yale where it now rests in the archives of their gallery.

== Design ==
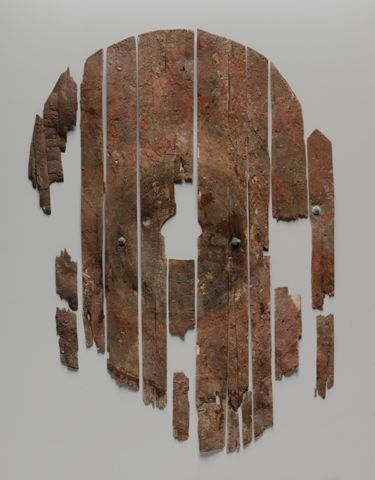
The shield in its current state in the Yale University Art Gallery archives.

The shield is unfinished, lacking a shield boss which would cover the hole in the center. If completed, it would have been held by a central handgrip concealed by the boss. Also yet to be attached was a metal loop which fit to the back of the shield. Simon James, in the final reports of the excavations, conjectured that the shield was made to have a strap run through it which would allow the shield to rest comfortably over a soldier's shoulder. The outside ring of the shield has a series of holes, which would have been threaded with twine to attach a leather binding, enhancing the shield's durability.

There is a series of decorative rings with varying geometric patterns surrounding the central hole. In the preliminary report, Franz Cumont draws connections between the broken guilloche pattern of the first ring and a similar pattern on the scutum from Dura-Europos, and compares the flecks of color in the dots of the second ring to the buds of flowers. James draws connections to the "wreath" pattern of the rings and the laurel rings on depictions of shields on Trajan's column.

The bottom half of the shield depicts the Trojans, identifiable by their Phrygian caps, welcoming the Trojan horse into the arched city gates. The Trojan horse is oddly lifelike, if not a literal horse, but its diminutive size is actually common in the Iliad's image tradition. In the preliminary report of the excavation, the bearded man nearest to the gate was confidently identified as Priam, and the woman in the center as Cassandra. The man in front of or perhaps astride the Trojan horse was a source of confusion. The label over his body was transcribed upon discovery as "Κεβριόνης", or Kebriones, a son of Priam who was shot on horseback by Patroclus far before the Trojan horse would have entered the city. Cumont dismisses this as an error of the shield painter.

The top half of the shield is a scene of conquest within the city. The cushions and mattresses strewn about the floor imply that the scene is in a banquet hall. A swarm of Greeks, depicted here in typical contemporary Roman military armor, push the citizens of Troy against the ground and raise swords above them. The Greek figures have a great deal of individuation on the right, but the figures on the left are very repetitive. The Trojan victims are depicted with much less detail than the conquerors, many lacking clear hands and legs or blending in with the cushions. There are two altars in the center. The man at the bottom is confidently identified as Priam because there is a strong iconographic tradition of depicting Priam's death at the foot of an altar. The two figures near the top altar, one half indiscernible, have been conjectured to be Cassandra, Hecuba, or perhaps Nike, bringing the laurels of victory to the Greeks.

Cumont, in the preliminary report of the excavations, links the shield to previous Trojan horse depictions in the Tabulae Illicae, the frescoes of the House of Menander in Pompeii, and most strongly with a scene from the Codex Romanus. He praises the shield's avoidance of depicting Troy in full on the shield and thereby making the city comically small, and also the humanism and detail of many of the figures. Cumont labels the highlighting and shading used, as well as the minor use of perspective on the inside wall of the city, as "Western", and the frontality of the figures (common to Dura-European art) and repetitive forms as "Eastern", making the shield a merging of local, eastern, and western styles and iconographic traditions.

== Making and original function of the shield ==
Although both the preliminary and final reports of the excavation describe the shields' material as poplar, in 1935 Samuel Record, a Yale forestry professor, identified it as a local species of pine. The shield is made of a number of thin vertical planks of wood, simply butt-joined side-to-side and adhered using an animal glue. The planks are varying in width (central planks are wider than outer planks) and thickness (as thick as 5-6 mm in center and shrinking to 2-3 mm on the outer edge), which suggest the original shield was convex, and flattened out due to being stacked with the other shields in the embankment. Anne Gunnison and Irma Passeri theorize in their investigation of the shields that steam was used to bend the wood over a mold to achieve this convexity.

After the preparation of the wood, a series of very thin ground layers were applied to smooth the surface for the artist to paint over. These layers were calcium-based and lead white, most likely chalk. Following that ground, the artist painted the entire shield (save for the central decorative rings) a reddish-brown color (rose madder), which served as another preparatory layer and a background for the figures. Then it seems the artist painted the figures directly onto this layer and added highlights, shading, and detail work on top of that paint. Virtually no mixing of paint was done on the surface of the shield itself. Herbert Gute's watercolors were originally thought to be overly optimistic reproductions, but upon examining the current-day shield under infrared light, the shield seems to match the drawings in level of detail. In a 1935 chemical analysis of the pigments, it was suggested that an egg based substance or a casein was used to bind the pigments to the wood. In Anne Gunnison, Irma Passeri, Erin Mysak, and Lisa Brody's chemical analysis of the shields they find that wax was the primary binding medium for the layers of paint, and there was likely bovine milk present in both the paint layers and the wood glue.

The question of why the shields were unfinished and deliberately discarded in the midst of a siege has generated several theories. Cumont writes that there's no reason to assume they wouldn't have been used in combat if finished, but also introduces the possibility that they could have been used solely decoratively, perhaps as display pieces for a shield-painter's shop. Simon James, in the excavation's final report, offers that they were used as parade shields, since they were too flimsy to be used in real combat. In addition, he raises that they may be shields used for cavalry sports, citing Arrian's description of cavalry sport armor in Ars Tactica: "[Cavalrymen] also carry shields, not of the kind used for battle, but lighter in weight (since their exercises are directed towards speed and elegance) and multi coloured [or 'cunningly-worked'] to look attractive': Arrian Ars tactica 34.5)."
