= Elogium =

Elogium may refer to:

- Elogium (literary genre), an inscription in honour of a deceased person
- Elogium (Star Trek: Voyager), the 20th episode of the American science fiction television series
