= Scutum =

Type of shield used in Ancient Rome

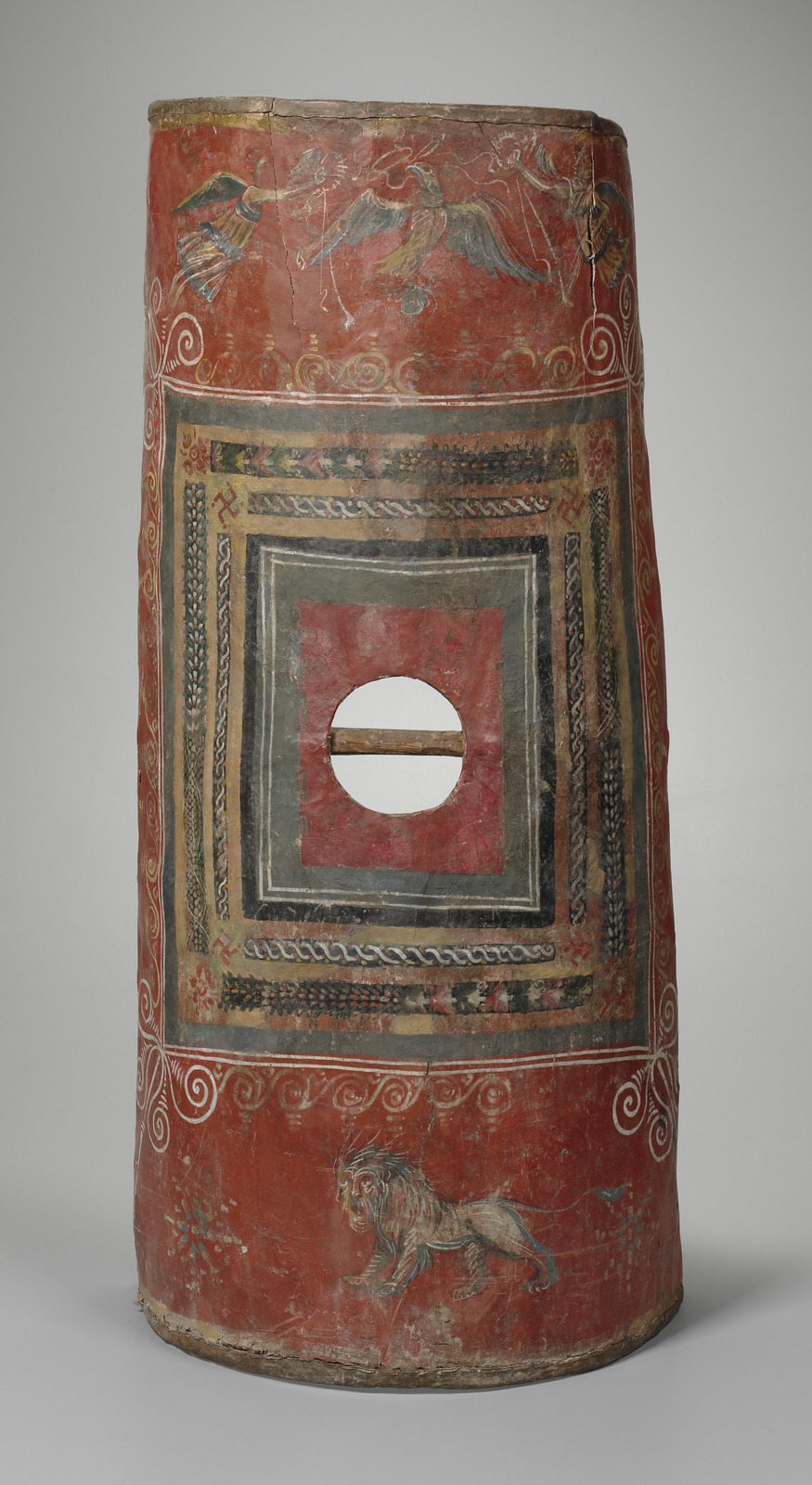
Mid-3rd century Scutum found at Dura-Europos

The scutum (Classical Latin: [ˈskuːt̪ʊ̃]; pl.:scuta) was a type of shield used among Italic peoples in antiquity, most notably by the army of ancient Rome starting about the fourth century BC.

The Romans adopted it when they switched from the military formation of the hoplite phalanx of the Greeks to the formation with maniples (Latin: manipuli). In the former, the soldiers carried a round shield, which the Romans called a clipeus. In the latter, they used the scutum, which was larger. Originally, it was oblong and convex, but by the first century BC, it had developed into the rectangular, semi-cylindrical shield that is popularly associated with the scutum in modern times. This was not the only kind the Romans used; Roman shields were of varying types depending on the role of the soldier who carried it. Oval, circular and rectangular shapes were used throughout Roman history.

== History ==
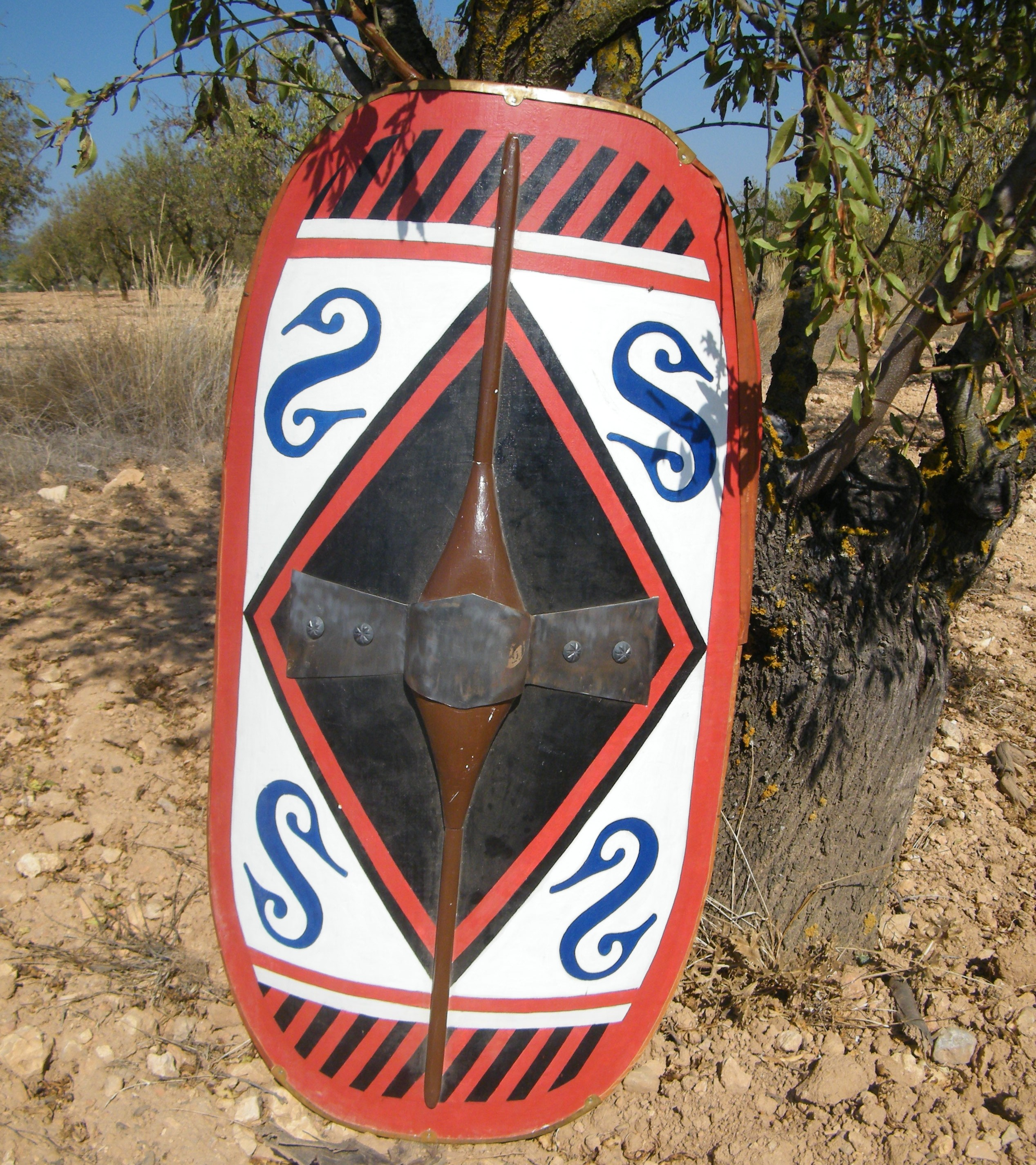
Reproduction of an Iberian scutum

The first depictions of the scutum are by the Este culture in the 8th century BC, and subsequently spread to the Italians, Illyrians, and Celts.

In the early days of ancient Rome (from the late regal period to the first part of the early republican period) Roman soldiers wore clipeus, which were like the aspides (ἀσπίδες), smaller (than the scutum) round shields used in the Greek hoplite phalanx. The hoplites were heavy infantrymen who originally wore bronze shields and helmets. The phalanx was a compact, rectangular mass military formation. The soldiers lined up in very tight ranks in a formation that was eight lines deep. The phalanx advanced in unison, which encouraged cohesion among the troops. It formed a shield wall and a mass of spears pointing towards the enemy. Its compactness provided a thrusting force that had a great impact on the enemy and made frontal assaults against it very difficult. However, it worked only if the soldiers kept the formation tight and had the discipline needed to keep its compactness in the thick of the battle. It was a rigid form of fighting and its maneuverability was limited. The small shields provided less protection. However, their smaller size afforded more mobility. Their round shape enabled the soldiers to interlock them to hold the line together.

Sometime in the early fourth century BC, the Romans changed their military tactics from the hoplite phalanx to the manipular formation, which was much more flexible. This involved a change in military equipment. The scutum replaced the clipeus. Some ancient writers thought that the Romans had adopted the maniples and the scutum when they fought against the Samnites in the first or second Samnite War (343–341 BC, 327–304 BC). However, Livy did not mention the scutum being a Samnite shield and wrote that the oblong shield and the manipular formation were introduced in the early fourth century BC, before the conflicts between the Romans and the Samnites. Plutarch mentioned the use of the long shield in a battle that took place in 366 BC. Couissin notes archaeological evidence shows that the scutum was in general use among Italic peoples long before the Samnite Wars and argues that it was not obtained from the Samnites. In some parts of Italy the scutum had been used since pre-historical times.

Polybius gave a description of the early second-century scutum BC:

The Roman panoply consists firstly of a shield (scutum), the convex surface of which measures 2.5 ft (76 cm) in width and 4 ft (120 cm) in length, the thickness at the rim being a palm's breadth. It is made of two planks glued together, the outer surface being then covered first with canvas and then with calfskin. Its upper and lower rims are strengthened by an iron edging that protects it from descending blows and from injury when rested on the ground. It also has an iron shield boss (umbo) fixed to it which turns aside the most formidable blows from stones, spears, swords, and other heavy missiles.

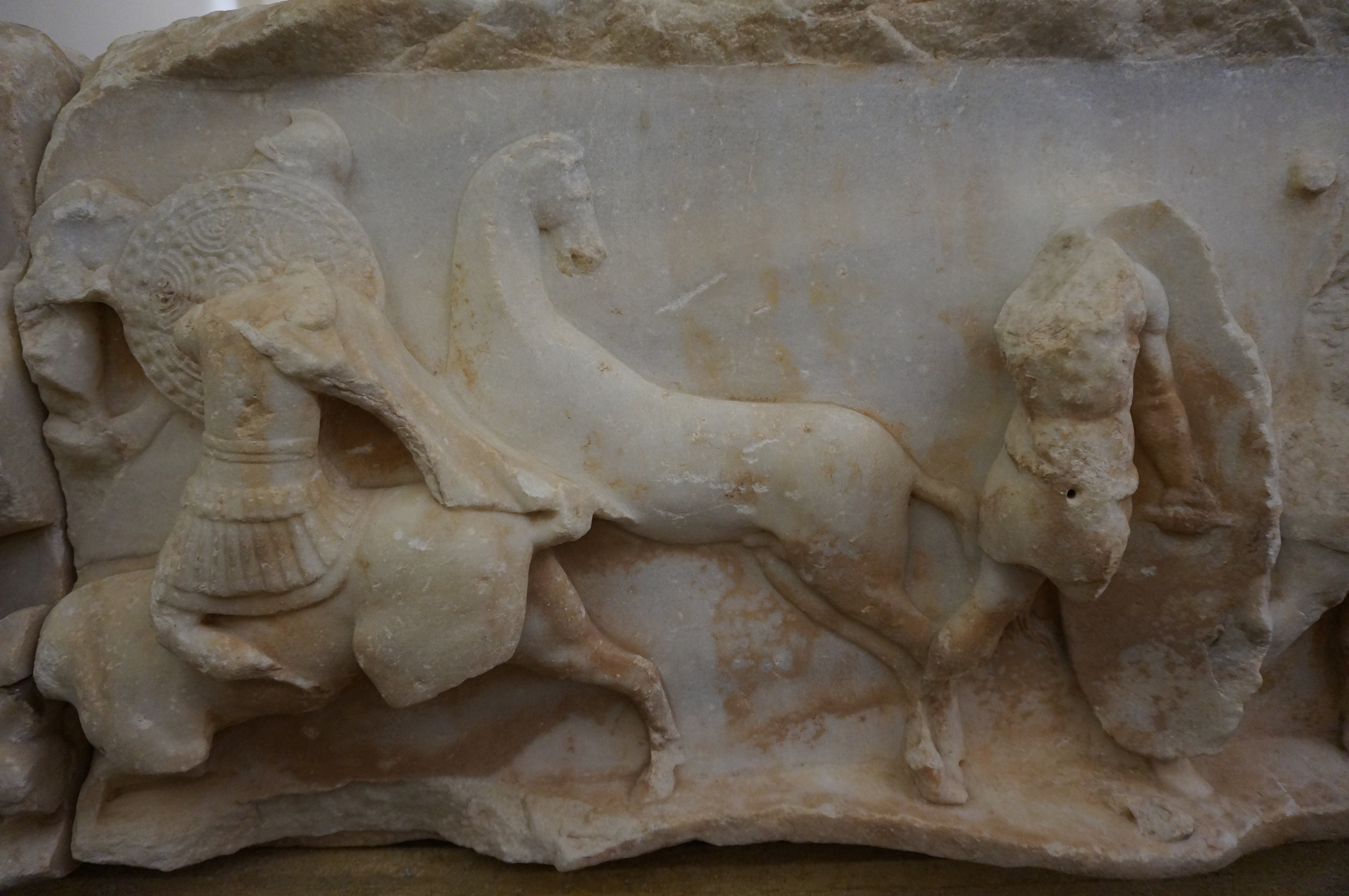
Scene from the monument of Aemilius Paullus showing an oval scutum

Roman rectangular scuta of later eras were smaller than Republican oval scuta and often varied in length from approximately 37 to 42 in (94 to 107 cm) tall (approximately 3 to 3.5 Roman feet, covering the shoulder to top of knee), and 24 to 33 in (61 to 84 cm) wide (approximately 2 to 2.7 Roman feet).

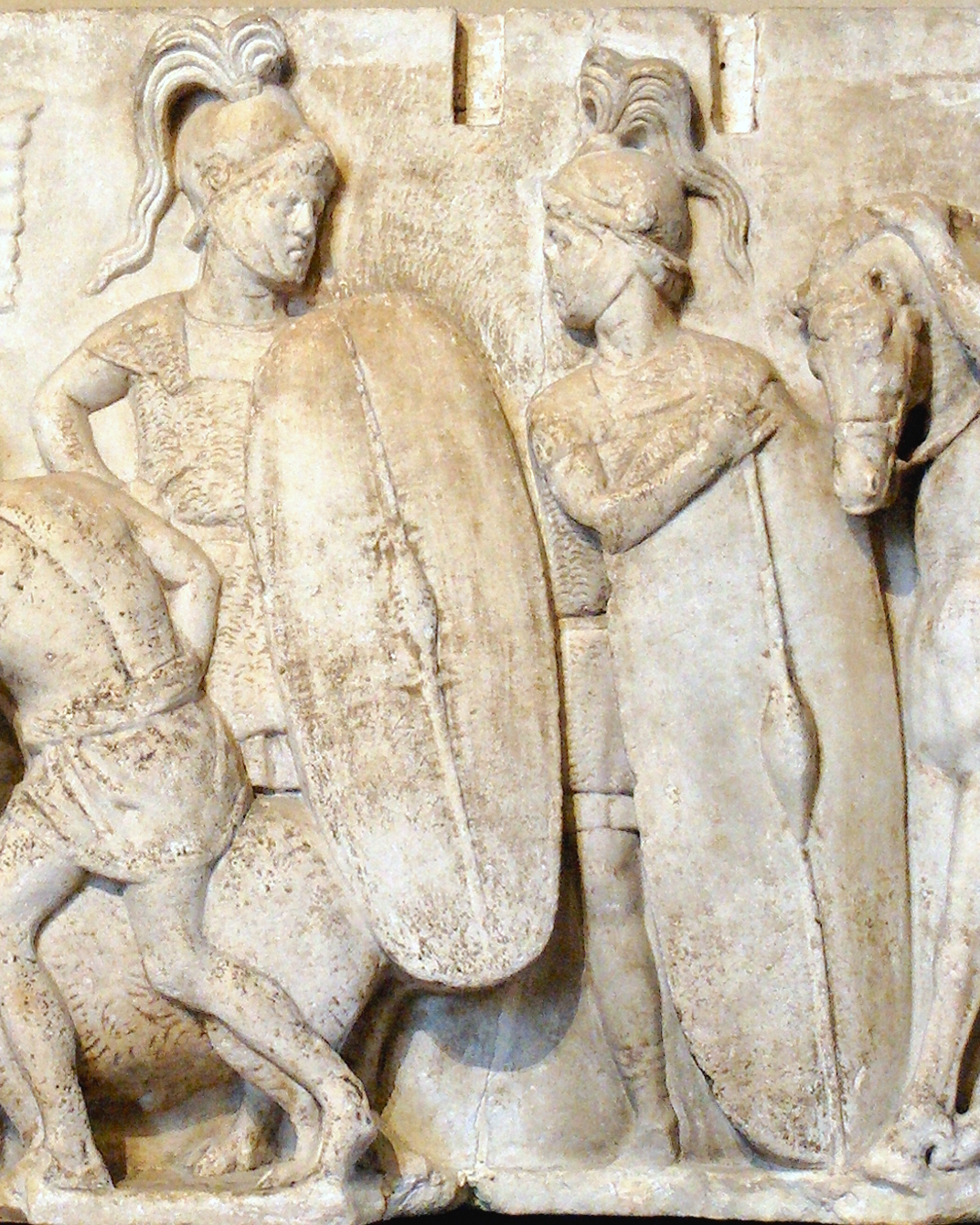
Section of the altar of Domitius Ahenobarbus, late 2nd century BC

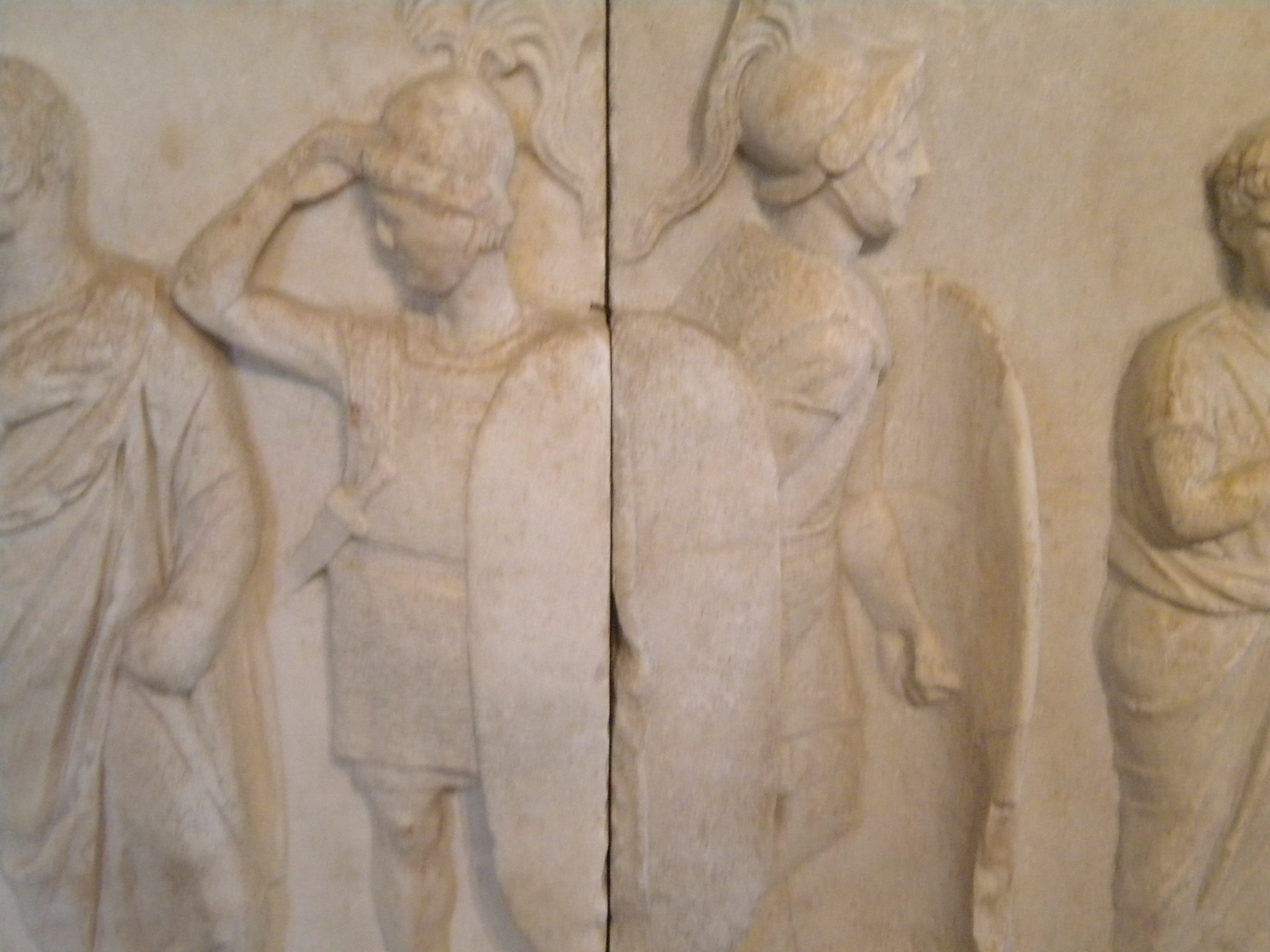
Another section of the altar of Domitius Ahenobarbus

The oval scutum is depicted on the Altar of Domitius Ahenobarbus in Rome, the monument of Aemilius Paullus at Delphi, and there is an actual example found at Batn Harit in Egypt. Gradually the scutum evolved into the rectangular (or sub-rectangular) type of the early Roman Empire.

By the end of the 3rd century the rectangular scutum seems to have disappeared. Fourth century archaeological finds (especially from the fortress of Dura-Europos) indicate the subsequent use of oval or round shields which were not semi-cylindrical but were either dished (bowl-shaped) or flat. Roman artwork from the end of the 3rd century until the end of Antiquity show soldiers wielding oval or round shields.

The word "scutum" survived the Fall of the Western Empire and remained in the military vocabulary of the Byzantine Empire. Even in the 11th century, the Byzantines called their armoured soldiers skutatoi (Grk. σκυτατοί), and several modern Romance languages use derivatives of the word.

== Structure ==
The scutum was a 10-kilogram (22 lb) large rectangle curved shield made from three sheets of wood glued together and covered with canvas and leather, usually with a spindle shaped boss along the vertical length of the shield.

The best surviving example, from Dura-Europos in Syria, was 105.5 centimetres (41.5 in) high, 41 centimetres (16 in) across, and 30 centimetres (12 in) deep (due to its semicylindrical nature). It is made from strips of wood that are 30 to 80 millimetres (1.2 to 3.1 in) wide and 1.5 to 2 millimetres (0.059 to 0.079 in) thick. They are put together in three layers, so that the total thickness of the wood layer is 4.5 to 6 millimetres (0.18 to 0.24 in). It was likely well made and extremely sturdy.

=== Advantages and disadvantages ===
The scutum was light enough to be held in one hand and its large height and width covered the entire wielder, making him very unlikely to be hit by missile fire and in hand-to-hand combat. The metal boss, or umbo, in the centre of the scutum also made it an auxiliary punching weapon. Its composite construction meant that early versions of the scutum could fail from a heavy cutting or piercing blow, which was experienced in the Roman campaigns against Carthage and Dacia where the falcata and falx could easily penetrate and rip through it. The effects of these weapons prompted design changes that made the scutum more resilient such as thicker planks and metal edges.

The aspis, which it replaced, provided less protective coverage than the scutum but was much more durable.

=== Combat uses ===
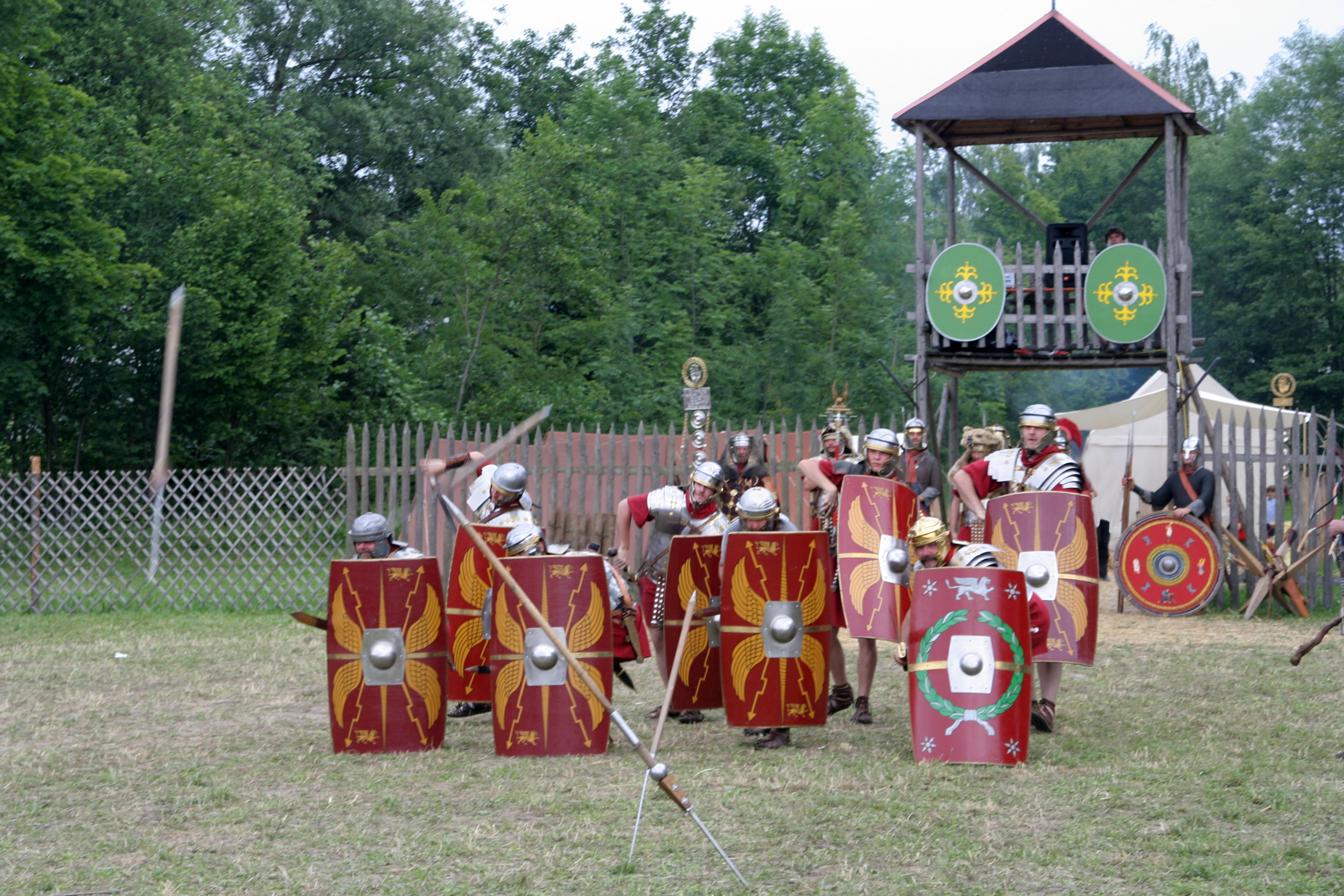
Reenactment of an early imperial legionary shield array

According to Polybius, the scutum gave Roman soldiers an edge over their Carthaginian enemies during the Punic Wars: "Their arms also give the men both protection and confidence, which they owed to the size of the shield."

The Roman writer Suetonius recorded anecdotes of the heroic centurion Cassius Scaeva and legionary Gaius Acilius who fought under Caesar in the Battle of Dyrrachium and the battle of Massilia, respectively:

Scaeva, with one eye gone, his thigh and shoulder wounded, and his shield bored through [with arrows] in a hundred and twenty places, continued to guard the gate of a fortress put in his charge. Acilius in the sea-fight at Massilia grasped the stern of one of the enemy's ships, and when his right hand was lopped off, rivaling the famous exploit of the Greek hero Cynegirus, boarded the ship and drove the enemy before him with the boss of his shield.

The Roman writer Cassius Dio in his Roman History described Roman against Roman in the Battle of Philippi: "For a long time there was pushing of shield against shield and thrusting with the sword, as they were at first cautiously looking for a chance to wound others without being wounded themselves."

The shape of the scutum allowed packed formations of legionaries to overlap their shields to provide an effective barrier against projectiles. The most novel (and specialised, for it afforded negligible protection against other attacks) use was the testudo (Latin for "tortoise"), which added legionaries holding shields from above to protect against descending projectiles (such as arrows, spears, or objects thrown by defenders on walls).

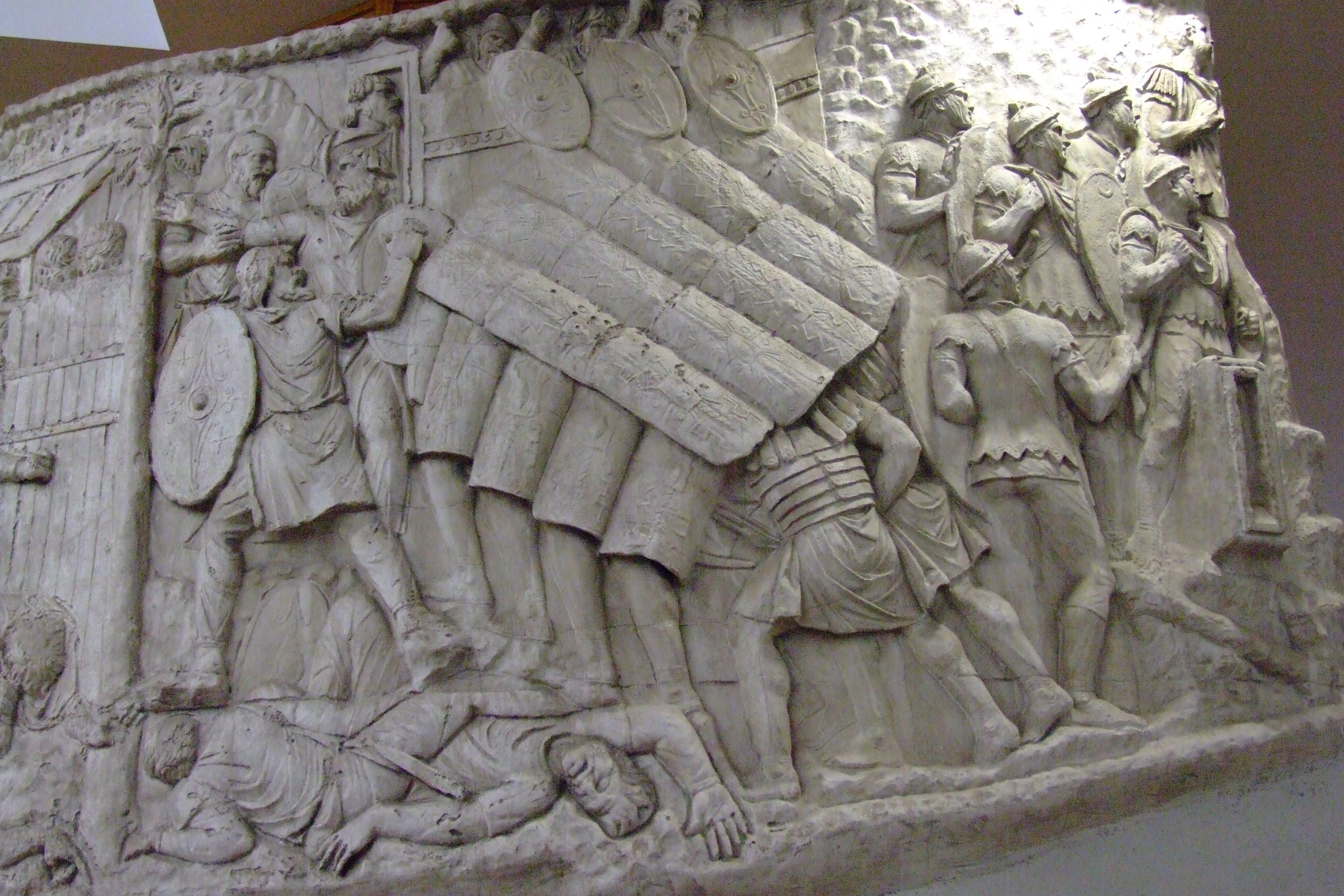
The testudo performed during a siege, as shown on Trajan's Column. There are faint eagle-wing and thunderbolt motifs on the scuta.

Dio gives an account of a testudo put to good use by Marc Antony's men while on campaign in Armenia:

One day, when they fell into an ambush and were being struck by dense showers of arrows, [the legionaries] suddenly formed the testudo by joining their shields, and rested their left knees on the ground. The barbarians... threw aside their bows, leaped from their horses, and drawing their daggers, came up close to put an end to them. At this the Romans sprang to their feet, extended their battle-line... and confronting the foe face to face, fell upon them... and cut down great numbers.

However, the testudo was not invincible, as Dio also gives an account of a Roman shield array being defeated by Parthian knights and horse archers at the Battle of Carrhae:

For if [the legionaries] decided to lock shields for the purpose of avoiding the arrows by the closeness of their array, the [knights] were upon them with a rush, striking down some, and at least scattering the others; and if they extended their ranks to avoid this, they would be struck with the arrows.

=== Special uses ===
Cassius Dio describes scuta being used to aid an ambush:

Now Pompey was anxious to lead Orestes into conflict before he should find out the number of the Romans, for fear that when he learned it he might retreat... he kept the rest behind... in a kneeling position and covered with their shields, causing them to remain motionless, so that Orestes should not ascertain their presence until he came to close quarters.

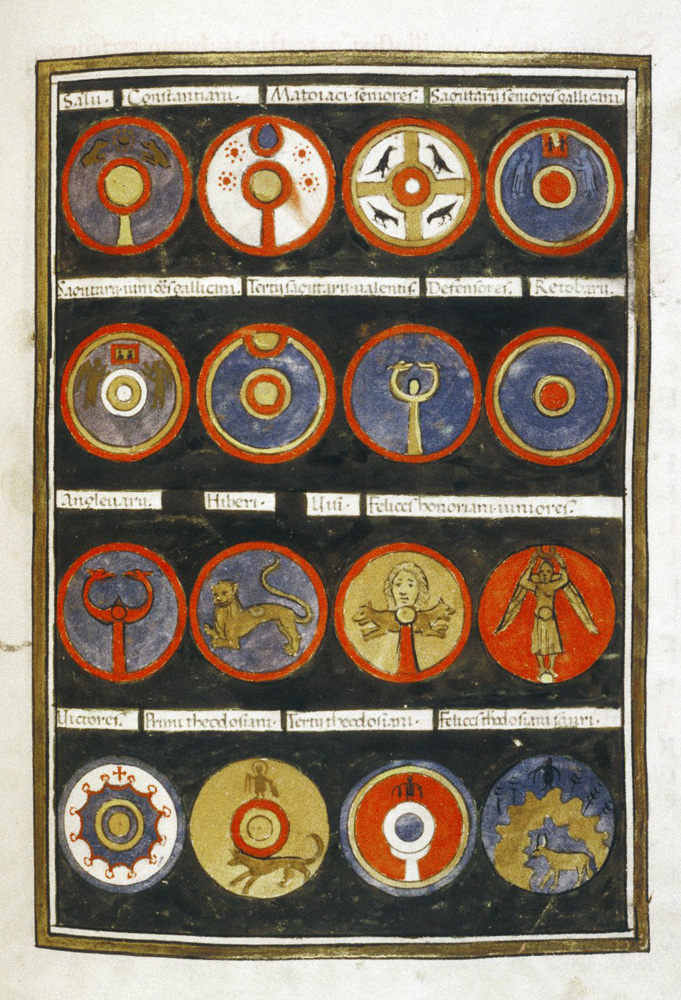
A selection of shield designs from the Notitia Dignitatum, with each shield representing a different unit.

Dio also notes the use of the scutum as a tool of psychological warfare during the capture of Syracuse:

Accordingly some of the gates were opened by [legionaries], and as soon as a few others had entered, all, both inside and outside, at a given signal, raised a shout and struck their spears upon their shields, and the trumpeters blew a blast, with the result that utter panic overwhelmed the Syracusans.

In 27 BC, the emperor Augustus was awarded a golden shield by the senate for his part in ending the civil war and restoring the republic, according to the Res Gestae Divi Augusti. The shield, the Res Gestae says, was hung outside the Curia Julia, serving as a symbol of the princeps "valour, clemency, justice and piety". The 5th century writer Vegetius added that scuta helped in identification:

Lest the soldiers in the confusion of battle should be separated from their comrades, every cohort had its shields painted in a manner peculiar to itself. The name of each soldier was also written on his shield, together with the number of the cohort and century to which he belonged.

== Other uses of the word ==
The name Scutum has been adopted as one of the 88 modern constellations, and by UK luxury clothing maker Aquascutum, which became famous in the 19th century for its waterproof menswear. Hence the name, which in Latin means "water shield".

In zoology, the term scute or scutum is used for a flat and hardened part of the anatomy of an animal, such as the shell of a turtle.

== See also ==
- Clipeus (shield)
- Imago clipeata (shield portrait)
- Parma (shield)

== General and cited references ==
- James, Simon (2004). Excavations at Dura-Europos 1928–1937. Final Report VII. The Arms and Armour and Other Military Equipment. London: British Museum Press. ISBN 0-7141-2248-3.
- McDowall, Simon (1994). Late Roman Infantryman AD236–565. Osprey Publishing. ISBN 978-1-8553-2419-0
- Nabbefeld, Ansgar (2008). Roman Shields. Studies on archaeological finds and iconographic evidence from the end of Republic to the late Empire. Cologne. ISBN 978-3-89646-138-4
- Robinson, H. R. (1975). The Armour of Imperial Rome. London: Arms and Armour Press. ISBN 0-85368-219-4.
