= Parma (shield) =

Round shield used by the Roman army

A parma or parmula (the diminutive of parma) was a type of round shield used by the Roman army, especially during the later period of imperial history since the 3rd century.

== Characteristics ==
The parma was about 36 inches (91 cm) across (or less) and had iron in its frame, making it a very effective piece of armour. Parmae had handles and shield bosses (umbones).

The parma was used by legionaries in the early republican period of Rome's history, by the lowest class division of the army— the velites. Their equipment consisted of a parma, javelin, sword and helmet. Later, the parma was replaced by the body-length scutum as velites were phased out with the so-called "Marian reforms".

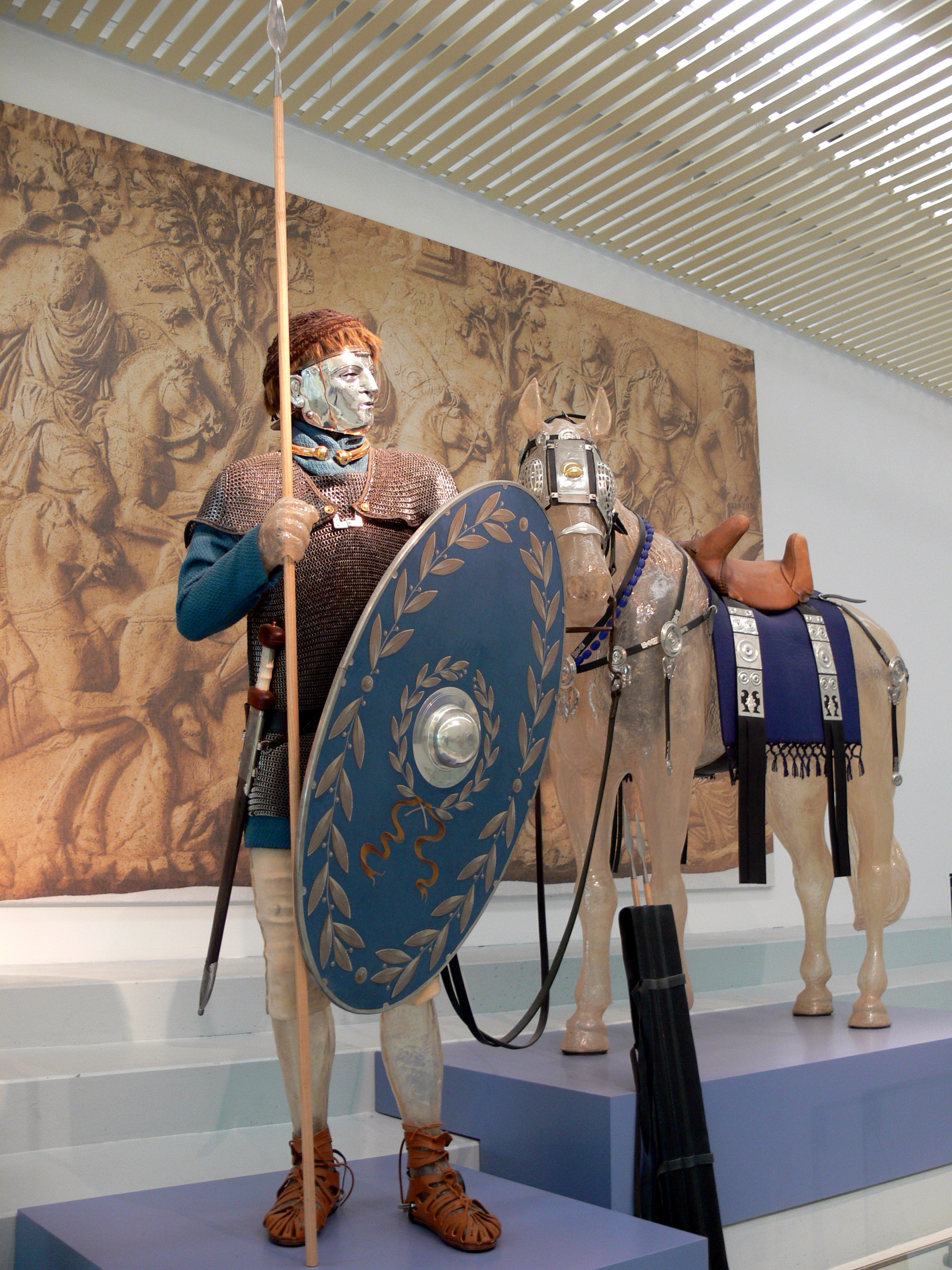
Reconstruction of a Roman cavalry man with a parma

== War use ==
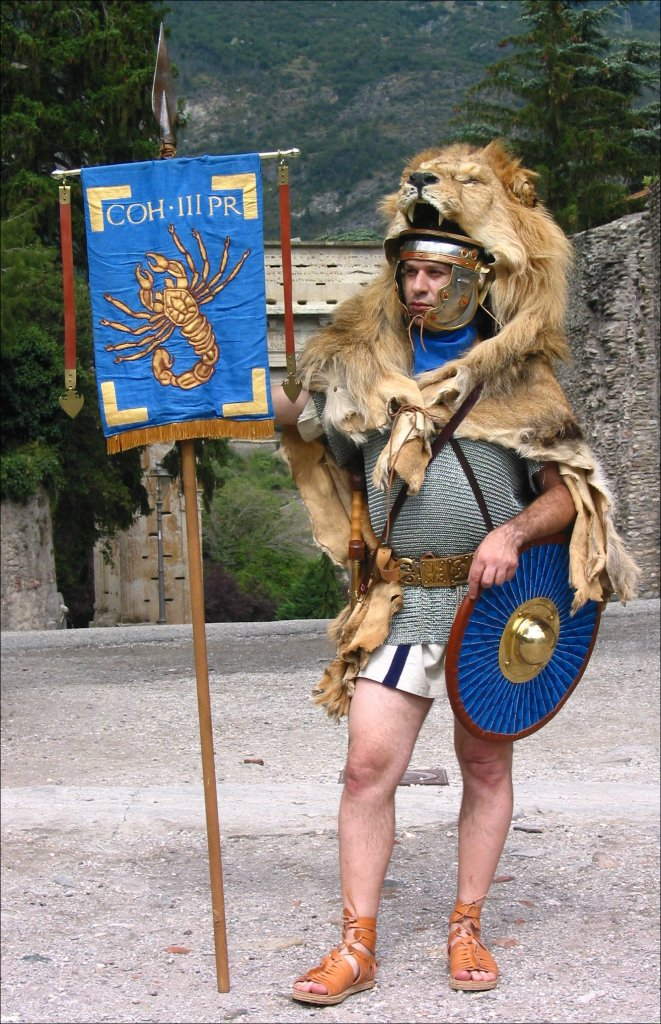
Signifer with a parmula

It was used mainly by auxiliary infantry and cavalry, with the legionaries preferring the heavier but more protective scutum, during earlier periods. It was used also by signiferi (standard bearers).

In Virgil's Aeneid, the parma is cited as a weapon utilised by the Teucrians in defence against the Greeks (Battle of Troy), and later against the Rutulians.

== Other uses ==
The parmula was the shield used by thraex gladiators. It was also used by the Roman vexilliferi or flag bearers that carried the standard that marked the cohort, as well as by most early auxiliaries.

In the Pyrrhic dance it was raised above the head and struck with a sword so as to emit a loud ringing noise.

== See also ==
- Roman military personal equipment
- Clipeus
