= Herbert Gute =

American watercolorist (1907–1977)

Herbert Jacob Gute
- Gute working on reproduction of painted wooden shield in Dura-Europos, 1935
- Born: August 10, 1907; Jeffersonville, New York, US
- Died: July 9, 1977 (aged 69); Yale House Services Hospital
- Education: Yale School of Fine Arts (B.F.A. 1933)
- Occupations: artist, watercolorist
- Known for: staff artist for the Yale excavations at Dura-Europos

Herbert Jacob Gute (1907 in Jeffersonville, New York – 1977 in Yale House Services Hospital) was an American watercolorist. As a graduate student he was a staff artist for the Yale excavations at Dura-Europos, in Syria.

== Biography ==
Herbert Gute got a degree in fine arts from the Pratt Institute and Yale in 1933. As a graduate student he took part in the Yale expedition to Dura-Europos in Syria, where he was a staff artist for three years. He brought to Yale and reconstructed there the oldest known Christian house church. Jewish Museum in New York, that opened in 1947, exhibited Gute's copies of frescoes from Dura-Europos synagogue.

Clark Hopkins, director of the Dura-Europos excavations, wrote about Gute:

Herbert Gute, a young and gifted graduate student in the Yale School of Fine Arts, came out to copy the paintings of the Synagogue before they were lifted from the walls. He was a painter of the first order, with a German precision and attention to minute detail. He worked hard, long, and most intelligently. An able athlete as well as a scholar, he added immensely to our recreational activities. He had been a baseball pitcher in high school and quickly excelled in horseshoes. A keen competitor, he kept daily scores of our doubles matches.

Herbert Gute, just graduated from the Yale School of Fine Arts, had been carefully chosen as a competent painter interested in making renderings. How far interest and competence as an artist can carry a new recruit in the type of technical drawing required on a dig is always a vital question. Herb turned out to be a painter of unusual ability; perhaps his German ancestry gave him his flair for meticulous detail. He too was astonished at the extent and richness of the Dura paintings. He recorded them exactly as he saw them, even to the minutest detail on the smallest corner of a panel. Many of the details of the original paintings were brought out in greater clarity in the copies, and where subsequent fading has occurred, the copies have preserved the original lines and colors visible before the fading. Careful study of fragments, where original colors were best preserved in their original shades, was of valuable assistance in making the copies. To study the combination of color, detail, and design today, one will find the copies better than the originals. Of course, one supplements the other, and both are indispensable.

Gute taught at the Yale School of Fine Arts from 1938 until his retirement in 1973, and a fellow at Calhoun College, 1955–1973. He also served as an art therapy advisor at the Connecticut Valley Hospital in 1949–1953.

== Awards and recognition ==
- Muriel Alvord prize, Yale, 1935
- 1st prize Connecticut Contemporary Painting, Springfield, Massachusetts, 1951
- 2d International Hallmark award, 1954. A.N.A.
- George A. Zabriskie Prize of the American Watercolor Society for the painting "Low Tide" in 1942.

Gute was a member of Audubon Society, Philadelphia Water Color Club, Silvermine Guild, American Watercolor Society; his paintings were exhibited at the Metropolitan Museum of Art, the Louvre, and the Jewish Museum in New York.

== Family ==
Herbert's parents were Rudolph Herman Gute and Martha (Mueller) Gute. Herbert married Catherine M. Schaefer on October 18, 1936, and had two sons, Herbert Schaefer and David Mueller.
