= Scutum from Dura-Europos =

Only surviving semi-cylindrical shield from Roman times

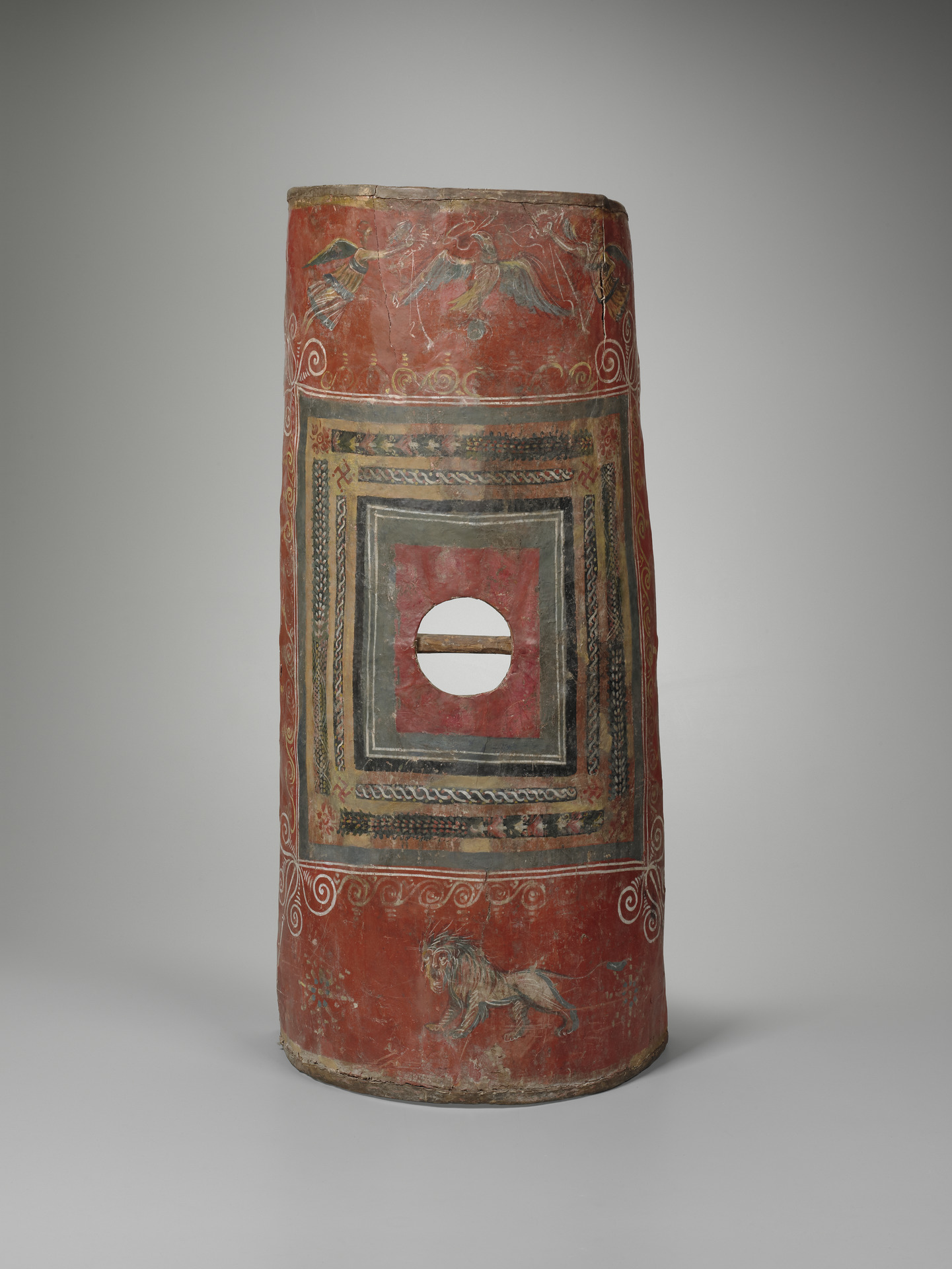
The Scutum from Dura-Europos

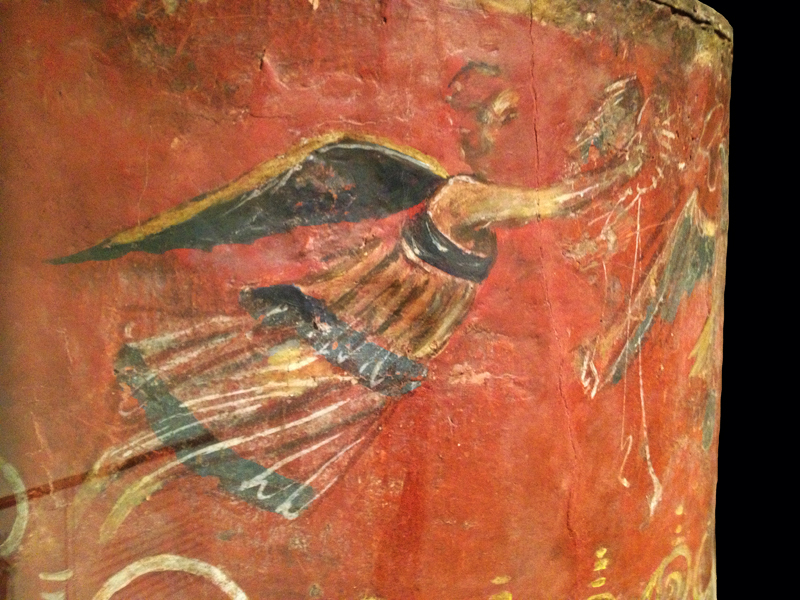
Detail of Victoria

The scutum from Dura-Europos is one of the few surviving semi-cylindrical shield (scutum) from Roman times. It is now in the Yale University Art Gallery (inventory number 1933.715). The shield was found in the excavation campaign of 1928/37 on Tower 19 of Dura-Europos (in present-day Syria). The city was besieged by the Sassanids in 256, eventually captured and destroyed. The dry climate enables very good conservation conditions for organic materials such as wood. Since the city housed a Roman garrison and was lost during a siege, a particularly large number of weapons were found during the excavations.

== Structure ==
The scutum is a rectangular arched shield that measures 105.5 by 41 cm and is mainly made of wood. It was found broken up into thirteen parts. It is made from strips of wood that are 30 to 80 mm wide and 1.5 to 2 mm thick. They are put together in three layers, so that the total thickness of the wood layer is 4.5 to 6 mm. In the center of the shield is a hole that was probably cut in the wood after the board was made, the umbo (central boss) is missing. The back of the shield was provided with reinforcing strips of wood, but they weren't found. There appears to have been a red covering of skin on the back. It is mentioned in the preliminary report of the excavation, but later was lost. The surface of the front was covered with fabric and then with skin or parchment, with a painting on it. There are several decorative ribbons around the central hole. Decorations include an eagle with a laurel wreath, winged Victories, and a lion.

The shield has been heavily restored several times. The main aim of these earlier restorations was to preserve the paintings, while the restorers did not care about the construction of the shield. Many technical details can only be traced today using old descriptions. The shield is now more rounded than in its original state.

== Background and history of finding ==
The shield was found during excavations in 1932/1933 in tower 19 of the city wall that is on the west side of the city. The events that took place during the siege could be reconstructed. The city appears to have been under constant attack by the Sassanids since the 220s. Shortly after 250 it even fell into the hands of the Sassanids, but was recaptured by the Romans in 254. During this time, the western side of the city was reinforced. The east side, on the other hand, is on a steep slope and did not need a city wall, but here it appears to be a gateway to the Euphrates. Adjacent houses were incorporated into the west wall and filled with clay bricks, so that a massive wall was created. This was fortunate for archeology: the structures incorporated into the wall were in excellent condition.

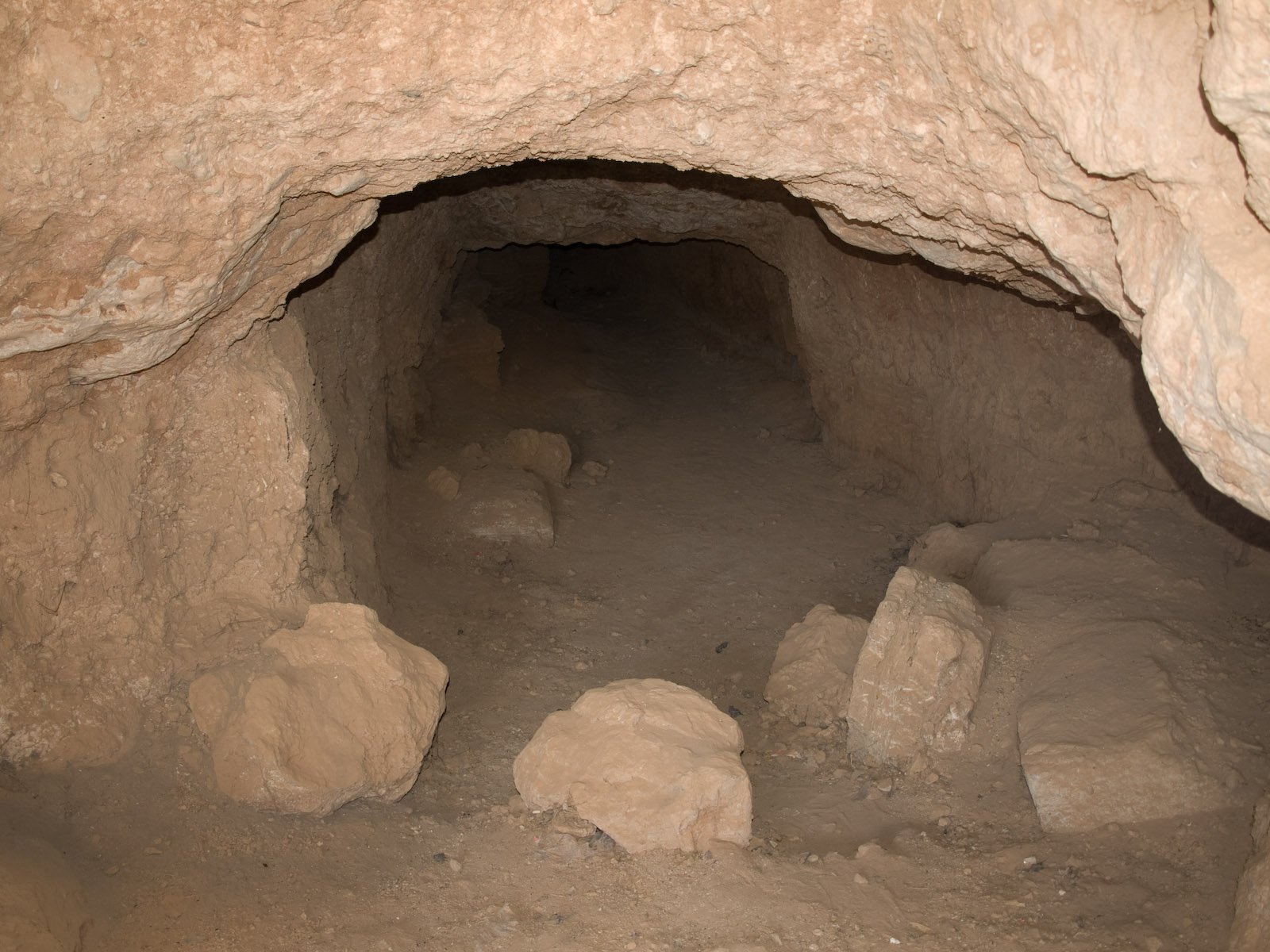
Entrance to the Roman counter tunnel

In 256 there was a major attack by the Sassanids. A camp larger than the city was set up west of Dura. A major operation during the siege was the excavation of the city wall to bring it down at one point. This action was not hidden from the Romans, and they dug their own tunnel to meet the enemies underground and to fight them. What exactly happened next is controversial in research. Remains of twenty Roman soldiers with full equipment were found in the tunnel, but only one corpse of a Sassanid. In the preliminary report of the excavations it was assumed that the tunnel simply collapsed and buried the soldiers. More recent considerations come to a different scenario. Accordingly, the Sassanids noticed that the Romans were digging a counter tunnel and waited for it to break through. When the Romans broke through the tunnel of the Sassanids, they were "received" with a fire reinforced by naphtha. The Roman soldiers burned or suffocated. The Sassanids then continued to build the tunnel until tower 19 and the wall partially collapsed, probably only a few hours, at most a few days later. Numerous objects were buried inside the tower, some of which were burned and fell from the upper part of the tower, and which were stored here. They are mostly weapons that have been remarkably well preserved, including the scutum. The operation as a whole failed, however, as the tower and the wall only partially collapsed and no breach was created in the wall.
