= Clipeus =

Type of shield used by Ancient Greek and Roman soldiers

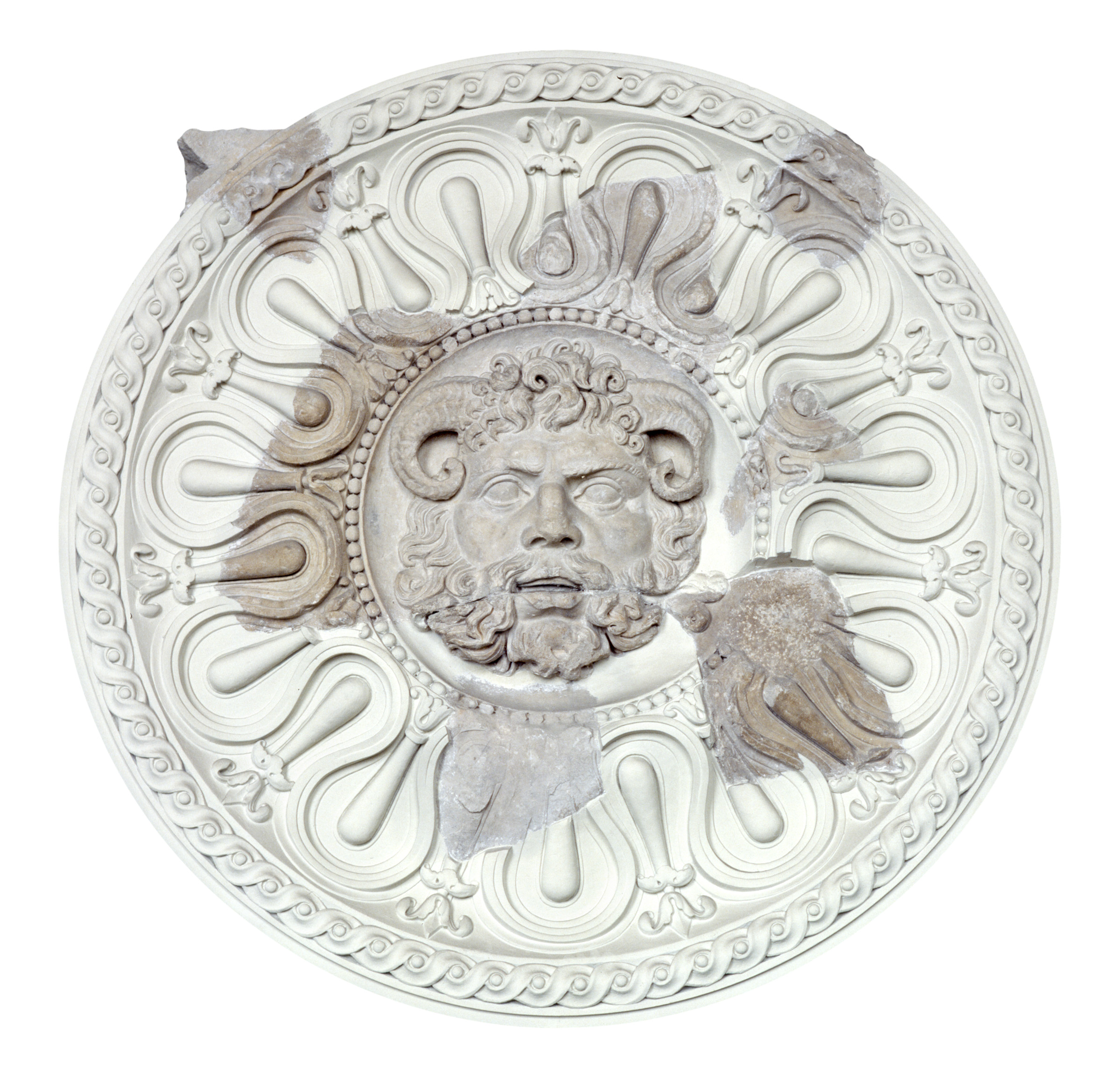
Clipeus of Iupiter-Ammon, conserved at the Museu Nacional Arqueològic de Tarragona

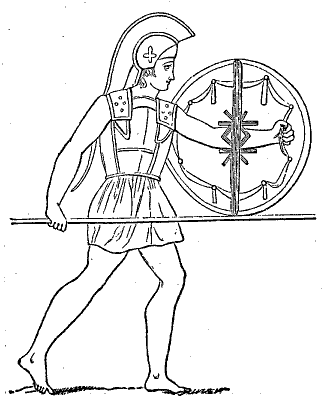
A Victorian depiction of a hoplite with a clipeus

In the military of classical antiquity, a clipeus (Latin: [ˈklɪpeʊs̠]; Ancient Greek: ἀσπίς) was a large shield worn by the Greek hoplites and Romans as a piece of defensive armor, which they carried upon the arm, to protect them from the blows of their enemies. It was round in shape and in the middle was a bolt of iron, or of some other metal, with a sharp point. The clipeus was similar to the earlier aspis.

== In art ==
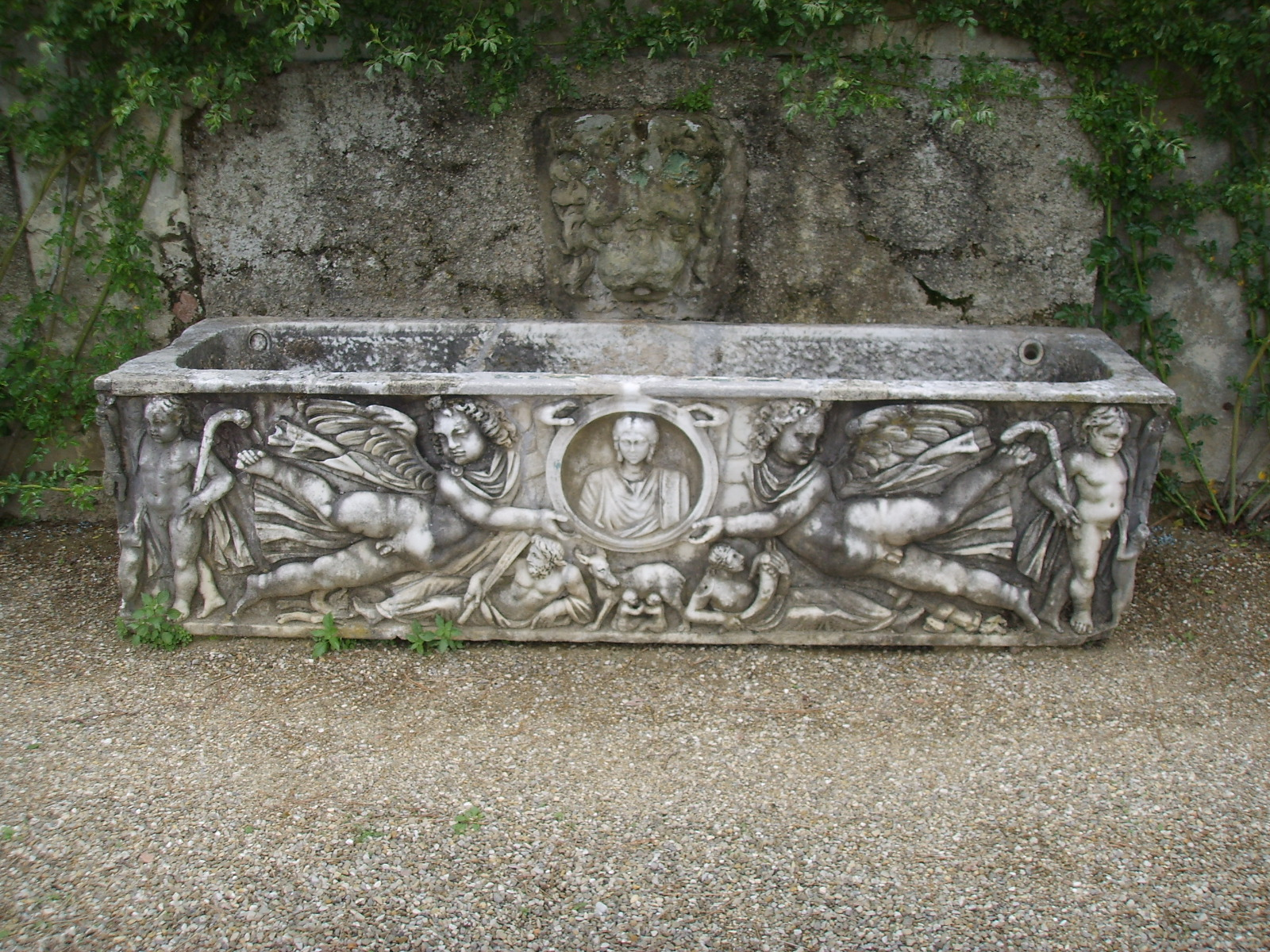
An Imago clipeata on a sarcophagus at the Villa la Pietra near Florence

Pliny the Elder also describes the custom of having a bust of an ancestor painted on a clipeus, and hung in a temple or other public place. From this tradition, round bas-reliefs in a medallion on sarcophagi and in other forms are known as imago clipeata or "clipeus portraits", a term usually restricted to Roman art.

== Roman use ==
The clipeus was used by Romans during the Roman Kingdom and early republic but was replaced by the legionary scutum, a convex rectangular shield, in the later Roman Republic. However, the scutum disappeared during the Crisis of the Third Century. All troops adopted the auxiliary oval (and sometimes round or hexagonal) shield (parma or clipeus). From examples found at Dura-Europos and Nydam Mose, shields were of vertical plank construction, the planks glued, and faced inside and out with painted leather. The edges of the shield were bound with stitched rawhide, which shrank as it dried, improving structural cohesion. It was also lighter than the edging of copper alloy used in earlier Roman shields.

The clipeus virtutis, Latin for "shield of bravery", was awarded to Augustus for his "courage, clemency, justice and piety" by the senate and displayed in the Curia Julia.

== See also ==
- Imago clipeata
- Peltarion
- Parma
- Clipeology
