= Cassius Scaeva =

Centurion of Caesar's 8th legion

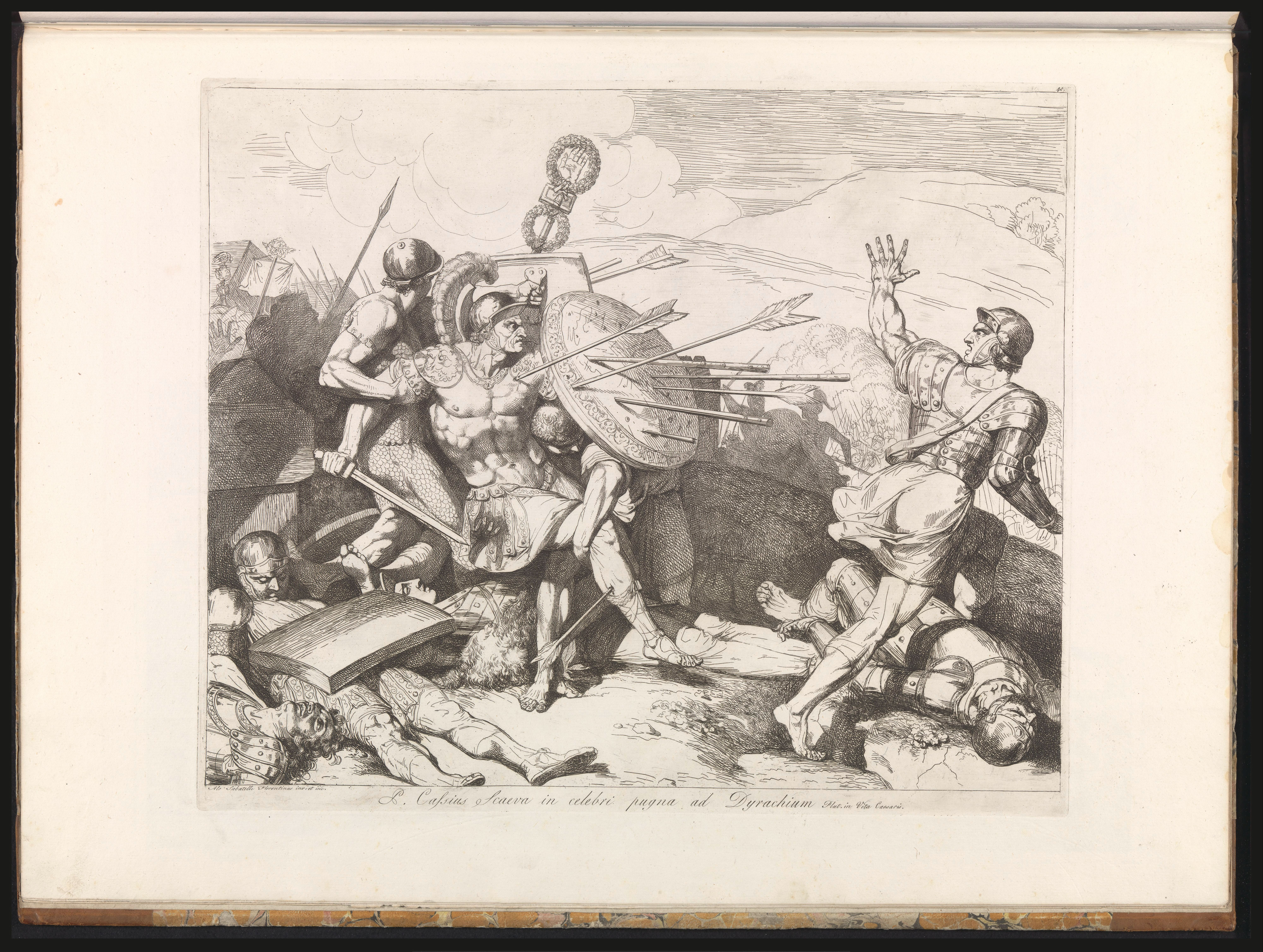
Scaeva imagined by Luigi Sabatelli, 1804

Cassius Scaeva was a centurion in Caesar's 6th legion. Scaeva fought in the Battle of Dyrrhachium (48 BC) where he would gain the praise of Caesar after his actions in combat.

== Battle of Dyrrhacium ==
On the 10th of April, Mark Antony was able to unite his forces with the rest of Caesar's army. Mark Antony brought with him, 4 legions and 800 Cavalry, arriving near Lissus, to stand with Caesar against Pompey. Even with the increase in men, Caesar was still outnumbered, on top of having issues with logistics. Despite these issues, Caesar depended on his legionnaires, with most being veterans and of a higher caliber than the average soldier. Scaeva was a centurion in Caesar's 6th legion, who may have served with Caesar when he was a praetor in Spain (49BC).

Due to the increase of men, Pompey believed he could just wait and deprive Caesar's forces of food. Aware of this, Caesar attempted to take Pompey's main supply hub at Dyrrachium. Though he arrived before Pompey and his forces, he was not fast enough to capture the base, so he decided to set up camp between the base in Dyrrachium and Pompey's army, who were on top of a hill called Petra. This new camp, was also on high ground but still left his forces vulnerable, so Caesar ordered to have a line of fortification constructed to protect their own forage parties and to also to attack of any of Pompey's forces that presented themselves. Pompey in retaliation set up his own fortification that stretched 15 Roman miles long, to Caesar's 17 miles.

After months, Pompey set off a series of attacks on sections of Caesar's fortifications to test them for any weaknesses. The majority of these attacks were a besiegement of arrows, with some accounts totaling 30,000 arrows. Scaeva and his cohort were in one of these section to be attacked by Pompeian forces. Scaeva's shield is estimated to have had 120 to 130 arrows in it after the attack. Following the arrows, 4 legions were sent into the section Scaeva and the 8th cohort were defending. Unwilling to surrender despite their injuries, they held the fort against the 4 Pompeian legions. Sources claim that Scaeva had been hit in the eye and thigh with arrows and kept fighting, even pretending to surrender to Pompeian forces, only to kill two of them. Caesar attributes this victory largely to Scaeva and his determination in battle.

To thank Scaeva for his actions, Caesar rewarded him with a prize of 200,000 sesterces and gave him a promotion from a Centurion of the 6th legion to the Chief Centurion of the legion, primus pilus. Caesar also rewarded the 8th cohort led by Scaeva by granting them double pay, grain, clothing, and military honors.

== Later years ==
This was not the last time Scaeva served Caesar, having become an equestrian and leading a cavalry unit for Caesar, the unit named after Scaeva himself, the ala Scaevea.
