= Imago clipeata =

Type of Roman portrait on a round shield

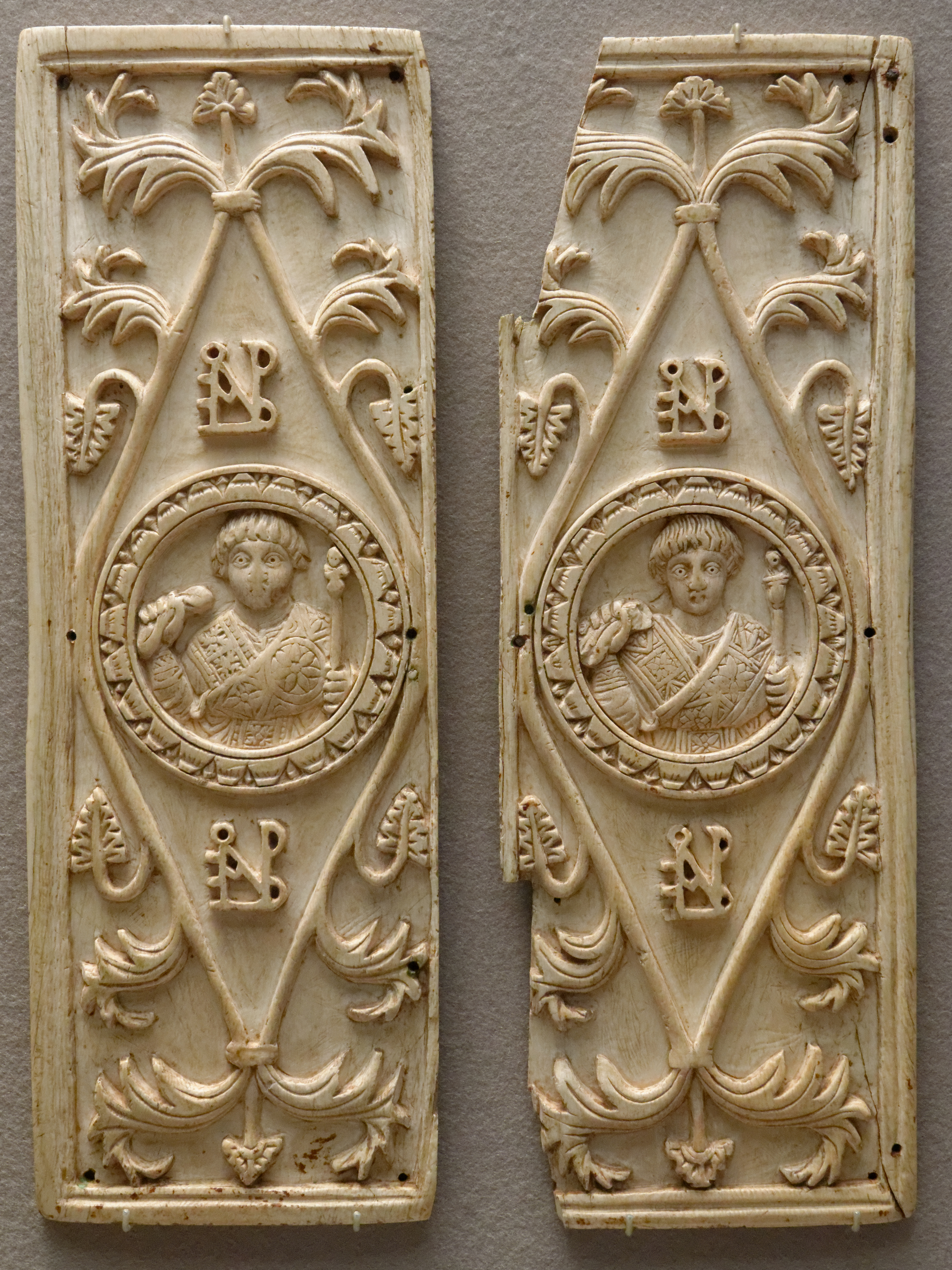
An imago clipeata on a consular diptych of Areobindus, Roman consul in 506 AD Musée du Louvre.

Imago clipeata (Latin: "portrait on a round shield") is a term in the art history of ancient Rome for images of ancestors, famous people or deceased shown as on a round shield (in Latin: clipeus). For other periods similar forms are called medallions. In the Roman world the imago clipeata was used to depict the ancestral family tree (Latin: Stemma) in patrician houses of the Roman Republic as described by Pliny the Elder (Historia Naturalis 35: 4–11).

These shield portraits can be seen in architectural sculptural decorations, on sarcophagi and on standards of the Roman legions among many other types of representations in the Roman and Early Christian world. In Italian Baroque imagery, medallion portraits supported by nymphs or genii came to signify an apotheosis. In this context they might be called tondi.
