= Roman army of the mid-Republic =

Armed forces deployed by the mid-Roman Republic

The Roman army of the mid-Republic, also called the manipular Roman army or the Polybian army, refers to the armed forces deployed by the mid-Roman Republic, from the end of the Samnite Wars (290 BC) to the end of the Social War (88 BC). The first phase of this army, in its manipular structure (290–c. 130 BC), is described in detail in the Histories of the ancient Greek historian Polybius, writing before 146 BC.

The central feature of the mid-Republican army was the manipular organisation of its battle line. Instead of a single, large mass (the phalanx) as in the Early Roman army, the Romans now drew up in three lines (triplex acies) consisting of small units (maniples) of 120 men, arrayed in chessboard fashion, giving much greater tactical strength and flexibility. This structure was probably introduced in c. 300 BC during the Samnite Wars. Also probably dating from this period was the regular accompaniment of each legion by a non-citizen formation of roughly equal size, the ala, recruited from Rome's Italian allies, or socii. The latter were about 150 autonomous states which were bound by a treaty of perpetual military alliance with Rome. Their sole obligation was to supply to the Roman army, on demand, a number of fully equipped troops up to a specified maximum each year. Evidence from Roman army camps near Numantia in Spain suggests that a much larger tactical unit, the cohort (480 men, equivalent to 4 maniples) already existed, alongside maniples, in the period 153–133 BC. By c. 100 BC, cohorts appear to have fully replaced maniples as the basic tactical unit.

The Second Punic War (218–201 BC) saw the addition of a third element to the existing dual Roman/Italian structure: non-Italian mercenaries with specialist skills lacking in the legions and alae: Numidian light cavalry, Cretan archers, and Balearic slingers. From this time, these units always accompanied Roman armies.

The Republican army of this period, like its earlier forebear, did not maintain standing or professional military forces, but levied them, by compulsory conscription, as required for each campaigning season and disbanded thereafter (although formations could be kept in being over winter during major wars). Service in the legions was limited to property-owning Roman citizens, normally those known as iuniores (age 16–46). The army's senior officers, including its commanders-in-chief, the Roman consuls, were all elected annually at the People's Assembly. Only members of the Roman equestrian order—the equites—were eligible to serve as senior officers. Iuniores of the highest social classes (equites and the First Class of commoners) provided the legion's cavalry, the other classes the legionary infantry. The proletarii (the lowest and most numerous social class, assessed at under 400 drachmae wealth in c. 216 BC) were until c. 200 BC ineligible for legionary service and were assigned to the fleets as oarsmen. Elders, vagrants, freedmen, slaves and convicts were excluded from the military levy, save in emergencies. During a prolonged such emergency, the Second Punic War, severe manpower shortages necessitated that the property requirement be ignored and large numbers of proletarii conscripted into the legions. After the end of this war, it appears that proletarii were admitted to the legions as volunteers (as opposed to conscripts) and at the same time the property requirement was reduced to a nominal level by 150 BC, and finally scrapped in the consulship of Gaius Marius (107 BC).

The legionary cavalry also changed, probably around 300 BC onwards from the light, unarmoured horse of the early army to a heavy force with metal armour (bronze cuirasses and, later, mail coats). Contrary to a long-held view, the cavalry of the mid-Republic was a highly effective force that generally prevailed against strong enemy cavalry forces (both Gallic and Greek) until it was decisively beaten by the Carthaginian general Hannibal's horsemen during the second Punic War. This was due to the greater operational flexibility Hannibal’s Numidian light cavalry allowed.

For the vast majority of the period of its existence, the Polybian levy was at war. This led to great strains on Roman and Italian manpower, but forged a superb fighting machine. During the Second Punic War, fully two-thirds of Roman iuniores were under arms continuously. In the period after the defeat of Carthage in 201 BC, the army was campaigning exclusively outside Italy, resulting in its men being away from their home plots of land for many years at a stretch. They were assuaged by the large amounts of booty that they shared after victories in the rich eastern theatre. But in Italy, the ever-increasing concentration of public lands in the hands of big landowners, and the consequent displacement of the soldiers' families, led to great unrest and demands for land redistribution. This was successfully achieved, but resulted in the disaffection of Rome's Italian allies, who as non-citizens were excluded from the redistribution. This led to the mass revolt of the socii and the Social War (91–88 BC). The result was the grant of Roman citizenship to all Italians and the end of the Polybian army's dual structure: the alae were abolished and the socii recruited into the legions. The Roman army of the late Republic (88–30 BC) resulted, a transitional phase to the Imperial Roman army (30 BC – AD 284).

== Main sources ==
As can be deduced from its "Polybian" epithet, the most important extant literary source on the Roman army of this period are The Histories of the Greek historian Polybius, published in c. 160 BC. The surviving chapters cover the First and Second Punic Wars. Chapter VI contains a detailed analysis of the organisation and basic practices of the army. Polybius is generally seen by modern historians as a reliable and balanced source, but there are some inconsistencies and unclear points of detail in his account. These partly derive from his use of Greek terms to describe Roman military units and other terms. Moreover, the chronology of his account is uncertain. It has been suggested, from features such as joint consular armies, that he describes the army as it was c. 218 BC, at the start of the Second Punic War, considerably earlier than his time of writing (c. 160 BC). It is also possible that his account contains details from various historical periods. Polybius' source for Chapter VI remains uncertain. It has been suggested he was using an old army manual. The second most important literary source is Ab urbe condita, a massive history of Rome published in c. AD 20, by the Augustan-era Roman historian Livy, whose surviving books XXI–XLV cover the years 218–168 BC. Although a narrative history lacking a specific analysis of the army as in Polybius, Livy's work contains much incidental information about the army and its tactics. Also useful are the monograph on the Jugurthine War by Sallust (published c. 90 BC) and the much later biographies of Roman leaders of the Republican period by Plutarch.

Unlike for the later Imperial Roman army, relatively little epigraphic evidence and pictorial evidence survives for army of this period. The most important bas relief is that on the tomb of Ahenobarbus (c. 122 BC), which provides the clearest and most detailed depiction of the equipment of mid-Republican officers and soldiers. The soldiers it depicts are: one senior officer, four infantrymen, and one cavalryman. Otherwise, there is a lack of tombstones showing soldiers in military dress as are common from the Principate era. The earliest such, dating from 42 BC, is the Padova Centurion.

Published evidence from archaeological excavation is also far less abundant than for the imperial era, although it is growing rapidly. A critical corpus is from Roman fortified camps built around Numantia during campaigns in Iberia, including the Numantine Wars in Spain (155–133 BC). The most important excavated sites are the camps at Renieblas, which range in date from 195 to 75 BC. Of these, camp III dates from the 153 BC campaign of consul Quintus Fulvius Nobilior. The Castillejo camp was occupied in 137 by Gaius Hostilius Mancinus and again by Scipio Aemilianus in 134–133 BC. A further site at Peña Redonda is notable. These sites, and others, have yielded both information of camp layout and finds of military and other equipment. This large sequence of sites was excavated in 1905–12 by Adolf Schulten, who interpreted the results as being consistent with Polybius' detailed account of the design of Roman camps. However, a reassessment (2008) of the data (including the results of later excavation of the sites) by Michael Dobson has concluded that the Numantia data only partially supports Polybius and suggests that troops were already partially organised in cohorts.

Of major importance in our understanding of mid-Republican military equipment is the hoard of some 160 Roman weapons at Šmihel in Slovenia (known to the Romans as western Pannonia), dating from the period 200–150 BC. This site was along the major Roman route from Aquileia to Emona (Ljubliana). Originally unearthed in 1890, these finds were not fully published until around AD 2000. They include one helmet, four swords (two of them gladii), two spears, one hundred and six pila of various types, thirty-seven javelins, arrowheads and other miscellaneous items.

== Background: The Roman–Italian military loose federation ==
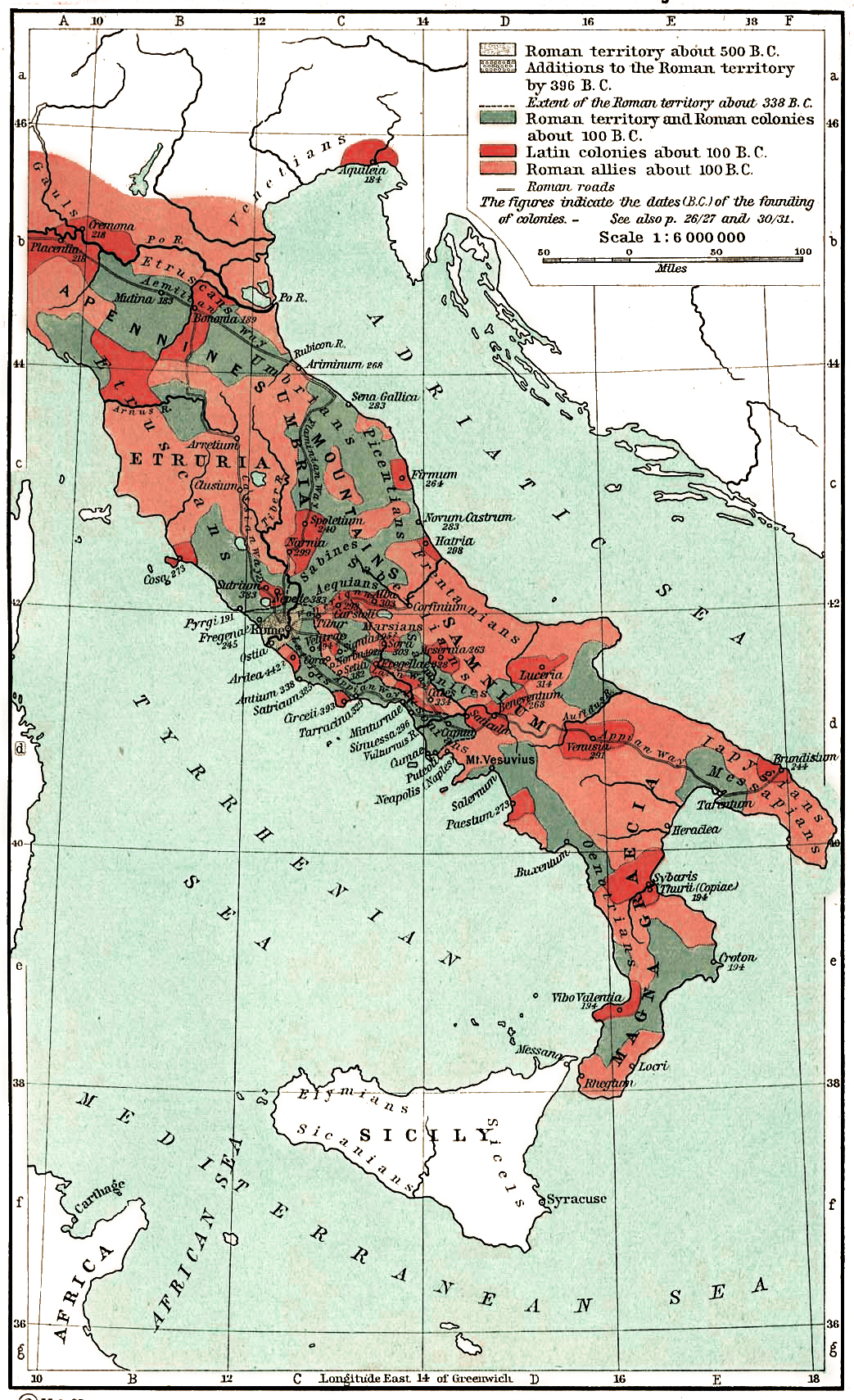
Map of the Roman confederation in 100 BC, on the eve of the Social War.

The Roman/Italian military alliance had fully evolved by 264 BC and remained for 200 years the basis of Roman military organisation. From 338 BC to 88 BC Roman legions were invariably accompanied on campaign by an equal number of somewhat larger allied units called alae (literally: 'wings', as allied troops would always be posted on the flanks of the Roman battle line, with the Roman legions holding the centre). 75% of a normal consular army's cavalry was supplied by the Italian socii.

The alliance was distantly descended the Foedus Cassianum ('Treaty of Cassius', 493 BC) signed by the fledgling Roman Republic with its neighbouring Latin city-states shortly after the overthrow of the Roman monarchy in 510 BC. This was an indefinite military alliance with the other city-states of Old Latium, the home of the Latin tribe, to which the Romans themselves belonged. Although extant details are fragmentary, the treaty's basic features were a mutual non-aggression and defense pact, requiring all signatories to assist any of their number who was attacked with all their forces. It also appears to have provided for joint operations in the field, if such were decided upon at an annual conference. Judging by the provision that the Romans and Latins were to share booty on an equal basis, it is likely that the treaty required the Latins to contribute roughly the same number of troops to joint operations as Rome. It appears that command of any joint forces may have alternated between Romans and allies. The motive factor behind the alliance was the threat posed to the cities of Old Latium by the surrounding Italic hill tribes, notably the Volsci and Aequi, whose incursions intensified in this period. By 358 BC, however, the hill-tribe menace had receded and the Romans repudiated the foedus. The succeeding period saw a steady increase in Roman encroachment in Old Latium.

In 341 BC, the Latin League, a confederation of the other city-states of Old Latium, went to war against Rome in an attempt to save what remained of their independence—the Latin War (341–338 BC). The Romans won a decisive victory and annexed most of Old Latium, unifying the Latin nation under their hegemony for the first time since the Tarquin era two centuries earlier.

Using the resources of their expanded territory, the Romans proceeded to establish control of much of the Italian peninsula by 264 BC. The defunct foedus Cassianum with the Latins was replaced by a new type of military alliance with the Italian city-states and tribes. As each was progressively subdued, a part of its territory would be annexed by Rome to provide land for Roman/Latin colonists. The defeated state would be allowed to keep the rest of its territory in return for binding itself to Rome with a perpetual treaty of military alliance. Unlike the Latin alliance which was founded on a basis of equality between Rome and the other Latin city-states, the new system reflected Roman hegemony. Strategy was determined by the Roman Senate alone, joint forces were always levied and these were always under Roman command.

The system was based on a series of bilateral treaties between Rome and, by 218 BC, about 150 Italian city-states and tribal cantons (known collectively as Rome's socii ('allies'). These would require the ally to "have the same friends and enemies as Rome", effectively prohibiting war against other socii and surrendering foreign policy to Rome. Beyond this, the sole obligation on the ally was to contribute to the federate army, on demand, a number of fully equipped troops up to a specified maximum each year, to serve under Roman command. The obligation on the ally was thus purely military, and not tributary. Little is known about the size of contingent each socius was required to provide, and whether it was proportional to population and/or wealth. The vast majority of socii were required to supply land troops (both infantry and cavalry), although most of the coastal cities were socii navales ('naval allies'), whose obligation was to provide either partly or fully crewed warships to the Roman fleet.

Despite the loss of territory, independence and heavy military obligations, the system provided substantial benefits for the socii. Most importantly, they were freed from the constant threat of aggression from their neighbours that had persisted in the anarchic centuries prior to the imposition of the Pax Romana. In addition, the Roman alliance protected the Italian peninsula from external invasion, such as the periodic and devastating incursions of Gauls from the Po Valley. Although no longer in control of war and foreign policy, each socius remained otherwise fully autonomous, with its own laws, system of government, coinage and language. Moreover, the military burden was only half that shouldered by Roman citizens, as the latter numbered only about half the population of the socii, but provided around half the total levies. Despite this, allied troops were allowed to share war booty on a 50–50 basis with Romans.

Despite these benefits, some socii rebelled against the alliance whenever the opportunity arose. The best occasions were provided by the invasions of Italy by the Greek king Pyrrhus in 281–275 BC and by the Carthaginian general Hannibal in 218–203 BC, during the Second Punic War. During these, many socii deserted Rome and joined the invaders, mostly Oscan-speakers of southern Italy, notably the Samnite tribes, who were Rome's most implacable enemy. On the other hand, many socii remained loyal, motivated primarily by antagonisms with neighbouring rebels. Even after Rome's disaster at the Battle of Cannae (216 BC), over 80% of the socii (by population) did not defect and Rome's military alliance was ultimately victorious.

== Expansion of the Roman Republic ==
The Polybian army's operations during its existence can be divided into three broad phases: (1) The struggle for hegemony over Italy, especially against the Samnite League (338–264 BC); (2) the struggle with Carthage for hegemony in the western Mediterranean Sea (264–201 BC); and (3) the struggle against the Hellenistic monarchies for control of the eastern Mediterranean (200–91 BC).

The first phase saw operations confined to the Italian peninsula. The second phase featured operations both in Italy (during Hannibal's invasion 218–203 BC) and other regions of the western Mediterranean: Sicily, Sardinia, Spain and North Africa. During final phase, operations were exclusively conducted overseas, both in the western and eastern Mediterranean.

== Army Evolution ==
The Early Roman army, from c. 550 to c. 300 BC, is widely believed to have been equipped Greek-style, as hoplite heavy infantry, complemented by light (unarmoured) infantry and light cavalry. The hoplites would fight in set-piece battles as a phalanx, or single, deep line of spearmen. The army was levied from landholding farmers for a single campaigning season each year. It is believed that in the late regal period (550–500 BC), the standard levy was a single legion numbering 9,000 men (6,000 hoplites, 2,400 light infantry and 600 cavalry). In the early Republican period (to c. 300 BC), the levy was split equally into two legions of 5,000 men each. The legion's subdivision, for both recruitment and tactical purposes, was the centuria, or company, of about 100 men each. Since most fighting in the early period was in the form of small-scale raids and skirmishes, rather than large set-piece battles, it is likely that most encounters were fought by single centuriae acting independently.

In the late 3rd century BC, at the time of the series of wars fought against the Samnite League, Rome's army went from two legions to four. This may have also been the time of the army's transformation from a Greek-style phalanx to the Italian-style manipular structure described by Polybius. It appears that the manipular structure was in place during the Pyrrhic War (280–275 BC). From this time onwards, instead of fielding a single line in battle, the Romans appear to normally have drawn up in three lines (triplex acies) of heavy infantry, called (front to rear) hastati (literally: 'spear-bearers'), principes ('main-liners') and triarii ('third-rankers'). It is presumed that originally all three lines were equipped with the thrusting spear (hastae, i.e., all three lines were once hastati), but with the introduction of the pilum (a heavy javelin) around 250 BC, only the rear rank retained hastae.

It is also from this time that the normal annual levy was doubled to four legions (two per consul). In addition, every Roman army which took the field was henceforth regularly accompanied by at least as many troops supplied by the socii. Thus, each consular army fielded was now quadruple the size of the earlier army.

Closely following the changes in organisation came the introduction of new, more effective weaponry and armour. During the First Punic War (264–241 BC), in Sicily, the Romans encountered Spanish warriors for the first time, serving as mercenaries for Carthage. The Iberians of the time were renowned for the design and manufacture of high-quality weapons, most notably the gladius Hispaniensis, the 'Spanish sword', which remained the standard close-combat weapon of Roman infantrymen until the 3rd century AD. Although Polybius states that the gladius was adopted by the Romans during the Second Punic War, it is clear from elsewhere in his own narrative that it was already in use during the Gallic invasion of 225 BC. The gladius replaced the generally shorter stabbing swords of Italic design used until then. The Romans were able to marry, from the time for the Second Punic War, the superb design of the gladius with the finest-quality steel then available in western Europe, Noric steel, from the Alpine kingdom of Noricum (roughly modern Austria). The pilum, a heavy javelin that eventually all Roman foot soldiers were equipped with, was probably also of Spanish design and also adopted during the First Punic War. (Alternatively, it has been suggested that the pilum was of Samnite origin, but there is no evidence that the Samnites possessed any such weapon). For the front two ranks, the pilum replaced the heavy thrusting spear called the [[Hasta (spear)|hasta]], with which all infantrymen were until then equipped. A somewhat later innovation was the introduction of the lorica hamata, or mail coat, replacing the bronze cuirass worn previously. Probably invented by the Celts of central Europe, mail was probably not adopted by the Romans before c. 200 BC, most likely after it was encountered during the Roman conquest of Cisalpine Gaul in the period 220–180 BC. By c. 122 BC, the date of the Ahenobarbus monument, it appears from the friezes that mail was standard for all infantrymen.

The next milestone in the development of the army was the Second Punic War. Hannibal's victories highlighted the deficiencies of the Roman army, which had evolved to fight wars against similarly equipped forces of competing Italian states. The infantry lacked specialist missile troops such as archers (sagittarii) and slingers (funditores). From c. 218 BC onwards, Roman armies regularly hired mercenary units of archers from Crete and Balearic slingers (the inhabitants of these islands became synonymous with slingers: Baleares was an alternative name for 'slingers' in classical Latin). At the same time, Roman cavalry had become a heavy armoured force specialising in the shock charge. While formidable, it lacked the operational flexibility afforded by the light Numidian cavalry (equites Numidae) so effectively employed by Hannibal in conjunction with his own heavy cavalry (Iberians and Gauls). From 206 BC, when the Numidian king Massinissa switched sides from Carthage to Rome, until the 3rd century AD, Roman armies were almost always accompanied by troops of Numidian light horse.

From the end of the Second Punic War (201 BC) onwards, the Republic's army fought exclusively outside Italy as it conquered a Mediterranean empire. This required men to remain under arms abroad for much longer periods, which was unpopular with farmer-conscripts concerned with the neglect of their plots. Their political pressure resulted in the passage of a law that conscripts could not be required to serve for more than six years consecutively. To circumvent this, there is evidence that the army in this period recruited ever higher numbers of volunteers for long-term service. The most suitable such recruits were from the ranks of the proletarii, the landless lowest social class, as they had no farms to tend and would be most attracted by the prospect of substantial gain in the form of booty. But the proletarii, despite being the largest social class, were excluded from service in the legions because they did not meet the minimum property threshold. It appears that the property rule was waived for volunteers from this time onwards. This is shown by the career of Spurius Ligustinus, as related by Livy. This quasi-professional soldier volunteered in 200 BC and served a total of 22 years, reaching the rank of a senior centurion, but he owned a tiny plot of just one iugum (0.25 hectare) of land, only half the two iugera regarded as the equivalent of the minimum property qualification.

The consulship of Gaius Marius (107 BC) saw the supposed launch of the so-called Marian reforms of the army. More dated scholars have ascribed to this general many of the changes that had transformed the Republican army by the time of its next extant detailed description in the pages of Julius Caesar's De Bello Gallico (composed in 51 BC), namely:

1. Admission of proletarii to legionary service
2. Recruitment of large numbers of volunteers
3. Replacement of maniples with cohorts as the main legionary tactical unit
4. Abolition of legionary cavalry

In reality, the sole documented reform by Marius was the establishment (in 104 BC) of the eagle (aquila) as the sole animal symbol to be used on the legion's standard (previously there had been a choice of five different animals, including the eagle). The attribution to Marius of the other changes is purely speculative, and probably erroneous also.

(1 and 2): Marius is credited with recruiting to his legions large numbers of proletarii in violation of the minimum property requirement. As the career of Ligustinus shows, proletarii volunteers were admitted as early as 200 BC, while for conscripts the property threshold had been progressively reduced to a nominal level: according to Livy, the original threshold had been 11,000 asses (1,100 drachmae); Polybius reports that it stood at 400 drachmae (4,000 asses) in c. 216 BC; in 140 BC, it was reduced to 1,500 asses, by then worth just under 100 drachmae. Marius simply acknowledged the reality that the property requirement had by his time effectively lapsed.
(3) Livy mentions cohorts of Italian allies in Spain during the 2nd Punic War, and it has been argued that the 2nd Punic War-era Roman general Scipio Africanus first introduced this unit in the legions almost a century before Marius' consulship. The most recent analysis of archaeological data on the layout of successive army camps at Numantia in Spain suggests that cohorts were introduced gradually in the period from c. 140 BC and the process was probably complete by the time Marius was elected consul.
(4) Roman cavalry is attested under Marius himself at the Battle of Vercellae (101 BC). Jeremiah McCall argues that legionary cavalry was probably abolished during the Social War (91–88 BC), but even this is uncertain. It is widely believed that Julius Caesar's legions in the Gallic war had no attached cavalry. This is based on an incident in 58 BC when Caesar, who needed a large cavalry escort to meet the German king Ariovistus, ordered his Gallic allied cavalry, whom he did not yet fully trust, to hand their horses to soldiers of the 10th Legion, which was from that time jokingly nicknamed equestris ('the mounted legion'). However, according to Plutarch, 7,000 cavalry "from the flower of Rome and Italy" served in Pompey's army at the Battle of Pharsalus (48 BC).

Far more significant for the Republican army's development than Marius' career was the Social War, in the aftermath of which all the inhabitants of peninsular Italy were granted Roman citizenship. This spelled the end of the old dual Romans/socii structure of the army. The alae were abolished, and all Italians recruited into the legions.

== Army structure ==
Until 200 BC, the republican army, like its earlier forebear, did not maintain standing or professional military forces, but levied them, by compulsory conscription, as required for each campaigning season and disbanded them thereafter (although formations could be kept in being over winter, and for several years consecutively, during major wars). After Rome acquired an overseas empire following the Punic Wars, armies stationed in key provinces became in effect standing forces, although no conscript could legally be required to serve more than six years consecutively.

The forces levied (or kept under arms) each year were normally divided equally between the two consuls, but the Senate could place additional forces under the command of the praetors, as well as extend the single-year command of both types of Roman magistrate, in which case they assumed the title of proconsul and propraetor respectively. Following the Punic Wars, proconsuls and propraetors served as the governors of the provinces of the overseas empire, in command of the military forces deployed there for a set term (normally three years).

While Roman citizens were recruited to the legions, the Latin and Italian allies were organised into alae (literally 'wings', because they were always posted on the flanks of the Roman line of battle). From the time of the Samnite Wars, when the number of legions levied each year was doubled to four, a normal consular army would contain two legions and two alae, or about 20,000 men (17,500 infantry and 2,400 cavalry). In times of emergency, a consul might be authorised to raise a double-strength army of four legions, but the allied alae would always number two, as they represented the two wings of the battle line, but were double strength e.g., at the Battle of Cannae in 216 BC, where each consul commanded an army of about 40,000 men.

In battle, it was the custom to draw up the Roman legions in the centre of the infantry line, with the Latin alae on the flanks. Hence, the two alae in a normal consular army were named dextra 'right' ala and sinistra or laeva 'left' ala. The Roman cavalry was posted on the right wing, the allied Italian cavalry held the left. The left wing thus outnumbered the right by three to one, a practice exploited by Hannibal at Cannae, who drew up his best cavalry to face the much smaller Roman cavalry and quickly routed it. The order of battle of a normal consular army could be summarised thus:

Order of battle of a normal Roman consular army, 3rd/2nd centuries BC
Left wing	XXXX	Left flank	Left centre	Right centre	Right flank	XXXX	Right wing
EQUITES LATINI (1,800 cav)		ALA LATINA SINISTRA (about 4,200 inf)	LEGIO ROMANA I* (4,200 inf)	LEGIO ROMANA III* (4,200 inf)	ALA LATINA DEXTRA (about 4,200 inf)		EQUITES ROMANI (600 cav)

- Note: The legions in a consular army bore either odd or even numbers. In the case above, the other consular army would contain legions II and IV.

=== Senior officers ===
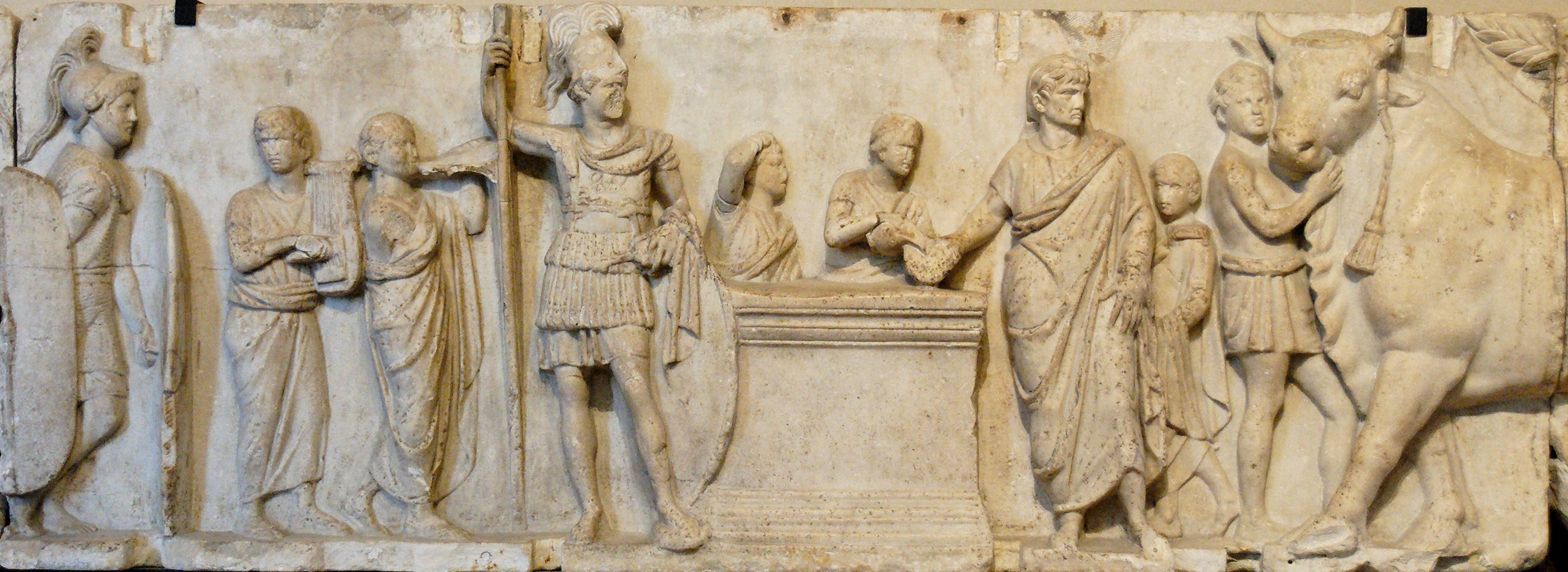
A Roman senior officer (centre), of the time of Polybius, as depicted on a bas relief from the Altar of Cn. Domitius Ahenobarbus, c. 122 BC.

The republican army contained no professional officers. Each of the two army corps (of two legions and two alae each) normally levied every year was commanded by one of the two Roman consuls, the highest of the annually elected magistrates. Equites were exclusively eligible to serve as senior officers of the army.

Each legion was officered by six tribuni militum ('tribunes of the soldiers'), totaling 24 tribunes for the normal levy of four legions. These were elected by the people's assembly from the ranks of those equities who had completed at least five years' military service, presumably in the cavalry. In those years in which more than four legions were deployed, the tribunes needed to command the extra legions were appointed by the consuls. Pairs of tribunes would take turns to command their legion for two-month terms.

In addition, equites provided the three decurions (decuriones, literally 'leaders of ten men') who commanded each turma of cavalry, and the praefecti sociorum, the commanders of the Italian confederate alae, who were appointed by the consuls. The duplication and rotation of command was a characteristic feature of the Roman Republic, which, from the time of the expulsion of the kings, had always aimed for collegiate offices, to avoid excessive concentration of power (e.g., two consuls, two praetors, etc.). Equites (and anyone else) who aspired to public office were required to perform at least 10 years' military service, which implies that the minimum age for public office was 27 years.

A military tribune wore a bronze cuirass (often engraved), pteruges, a mantle, and an Attic-style helmet with horsehair plume. Unlike lower ranks, officers never adopted mail armour.

=== Legionary infantry ===
==== Levy and conditions of service ====
Conscription of recruits would take place in the Campus Martius (Field of Mars) on the outskirts of Rome under the supervision of the consuls.

Service in the legions was limited to property-owning Roman citizens, normally those known as iuniores (age 17–46). Elders, paupers, debtors, convicts, freedmen and slaves were excluded, save in emergencies. The service that each recruit was assigned to depended on his property-assessed social class. Each soldier was originally expected to pay for his own equipment, so persons of the lowest class (below assessed wealth of 150 drachmae) were not eligible for service in the legions. According to the Greek author Polybius, these were assigned to naval service as oarsmen, who required no equipment. Of the other classes, the poorest troops would join the velites (singular form: veles 'light infantry'), who did not bear body armour and whose equipment was thus less expensive than a heavy infantryman's. Those with the highest property rating, and thus able to afford their own horse, joined the cavalry. The majority of Roman foot soldiers came from the families of small farmer-freeholders (i.e., peasants who owned small plots of land).

At an early stage, however, the state assumed the cost of armour and weapons, probably when pay was introduced for both infantry and cavalry around 400 BC. However, it is unclear whether the cost of armour and weapons was deducted from pay: food, clothing and other equipment certainly were. Armour and weapons were certainly provided by the state by the time of the Second Punic War, during which the minimum property qualification was largely ignored because of manpower shortages. This position probably continued after the war, at least as regards volunteers.

Iuniores infantrymen (aged 17–46) were liable to call-up for a maximum of 16 campaigns (but no more than six years in succession) until age 46, although this could be extend to 20 years in emergencies (men over 46 years of age, known as seniores, were not liable to call-up save in emergencies). At the time of Polybius, pay was set at two obols, or a third of a drachma (denarius after 211 BC) per day, for the period that they were held under arms. (For comparison, an imperial-era legionary of the 1st century AD was paid around twice as much per day until around AD 85, and nearly one denarius per day thereafter, year-round, as they were professionals). In addition, the foot soldier was entitled to a share in the spoils of war (captives sold as slaves, animals, treasure, weapons and other goods) which were sold at auction and the proceeds distributed to officers and men according to established criteria.

==== Organization ====
The normal size of a legion in this period was 4,200 infantry, of which 3,000 were heavily armed and 1,200 velites (plus 200–300 cavalry). In times of emergency, a legion of 5,000 infantry could be levied, of which 3,800 would be heavy infantry. However, Polybius and Livy also mention legions of 6,000 infantry. This has led Roth to conclude that republican legions were variable in size, depending on circumstances when they were raised. The heavy infantry of the earlier legion was organised into 30 centuriae units of 100 men each. The subdivisions in the mid-republican period were called maniples (manipuli, from manus 'hand'). There were 10 maniples in each of the three lines that a legion was drawn up in for battle: hastati, principes and triarii, for a total of 30 maniples in each legion. The maniples of the front two lines contained twice as many men (120) as those in the rear line (60). If the legion numbered 5,000 men, the maniples in the front lines were increased to 160 men each. Membership of each line was determined by age group: the hastati contained the younger men (up to 25 years old); the principes those in the 26–35 group; and the triarii the older men (36–46).

Each maniple was commanded by two centurions (centuriones, literally 'leaders of 100 men'), one senior (prior), one junior (posterior), who were elected by the unit's members. Centurions were paid double the rate of their men (i.e., four obols, or two-thirds of a drachma per day). Each centurion would then appoint a deputy (optio), whose role was to supervise the rear of the unit in action, while the centurions led from the front. In addition, each maniple included two signiferi (standard-bearers), appointed by the centurions, and at least one tubicen (trumpeter).

The presence of two centurions and two standard-bearers in each maniple has led many historians to assume that a maniple contained two centuriae, the basic unit of the earlier Roman army. In this scenario, the centuriae of the front two ranks would contain 60 men each, but Polybius makes clear that the maniple was the smallest tactical unit in the army. It was in some cases, smaller than the later cohort. Furthermore, the sources are clear that a maniple possessed only one signum, or standard. Indeed, signum was used as an alternative name for manipulus. Thus, the role of the maniple's second signifer was presumably to act as a substitute for the first if the latter fell in combat. This is how Polybius explains the presence of two centurions in each maniple, emphasizing that the senior one was in command of the maniple. Furthermore, if each maniple contained two centuriae, the centuriae of the triarii would contain only 30 men each, improbably few for a unit that was nominally 100-strong. Thus, it is possible that centuriae did not exist in this period and were wholly replaced by maniples.

==== Equipment ====
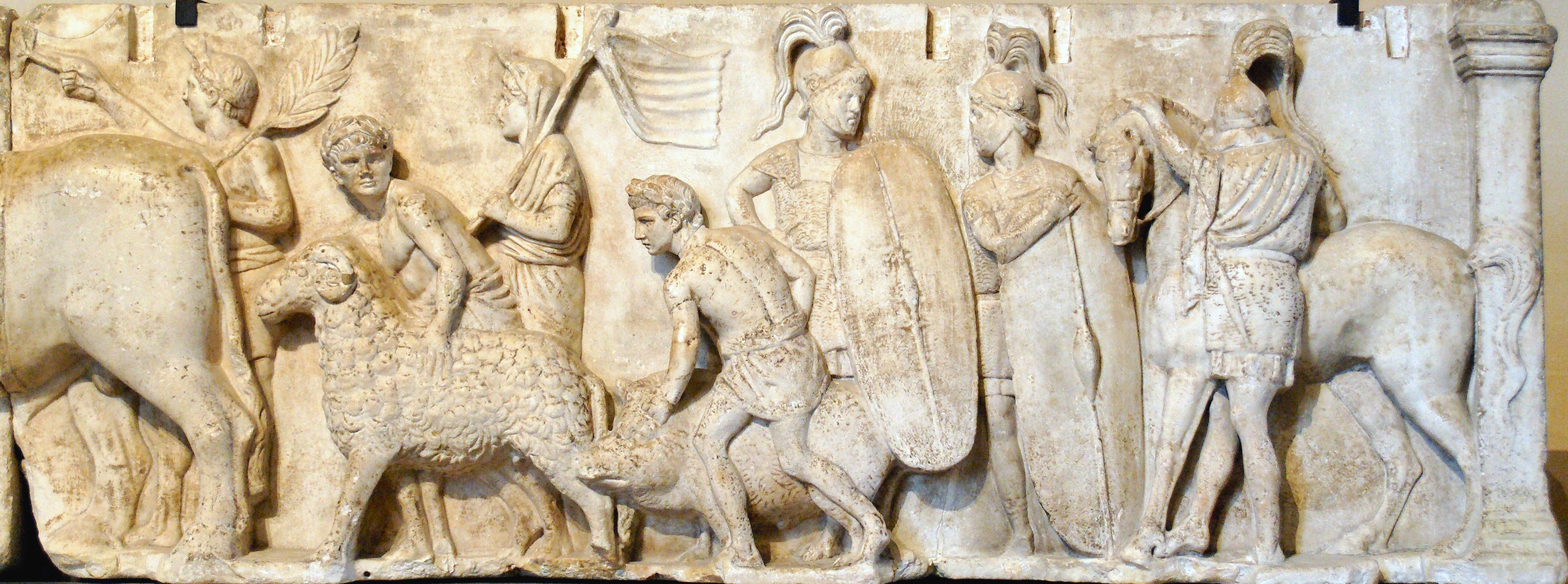
Detail from the Ahenobarbus relief showing (centre-right) two Roman foot soldiers c. 122 BC.

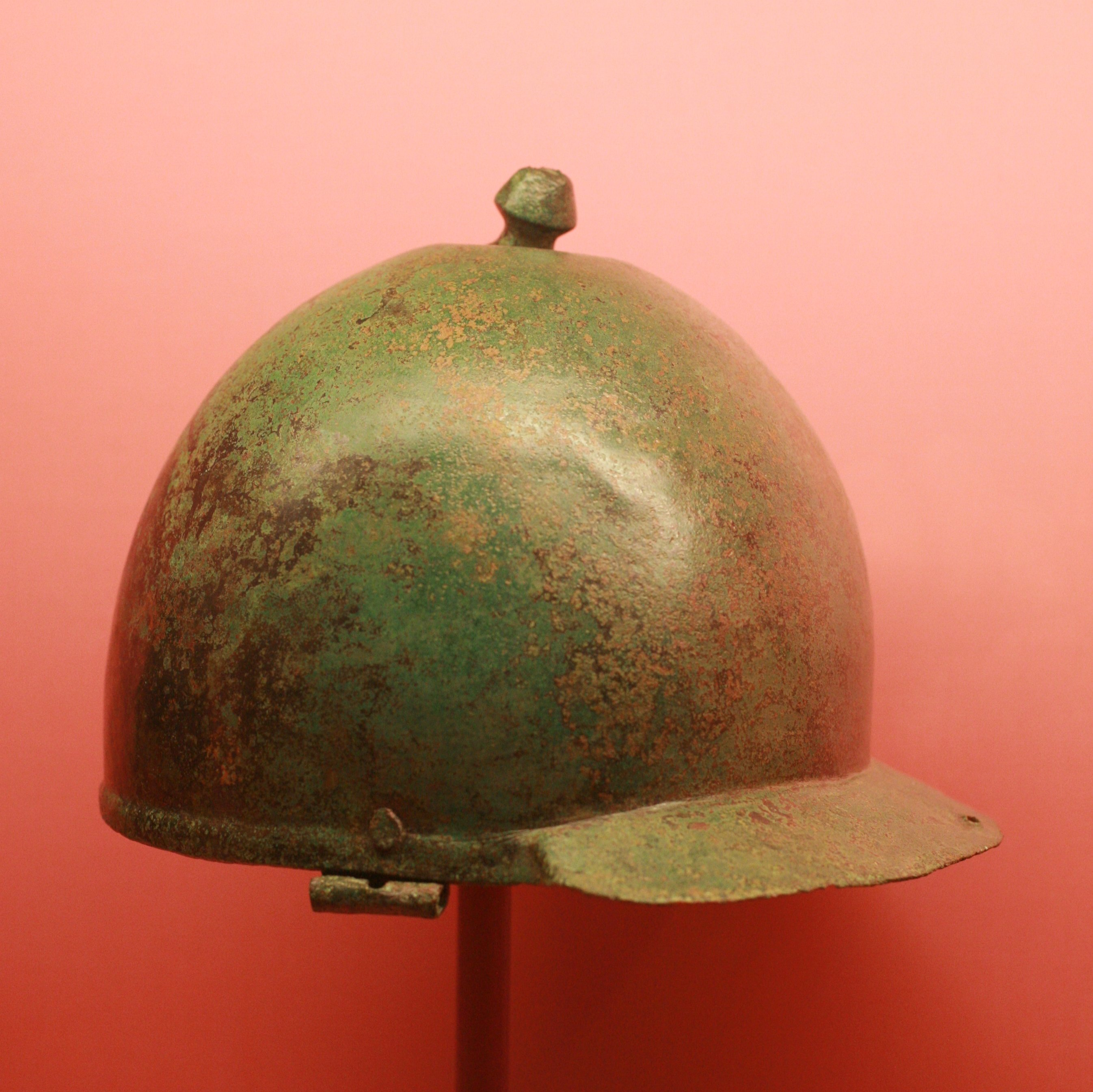
The bowl of a Montefortino-type helmet, which was used by Roman infantry between c. 300 BC and the 1st century AD.

===== Body armour =====
Chain mail coats (known then simply as the lorica) were worn by the wealthier infantry and offered superior protection to the small square chest-piece used as an alternative. Chain mail was, however, heavier and more expensive to manufacture. The mail coats worn seem to have had a double thickness on the shoulders for extra protection against downward cuts. Polybius states that only those soldiers rated over 10,000 drachmae (i.e., the First Class of commoners) wore a mail coat, while the rest wore a pectorale, or small, square breastplate designed to protect the heart. The First Class at this time served mainly in the cavalry, so this would imply that only a tiny minority of heavy infantrymen wore mail. This would also result in different armour within the same ranks. As the Ahenobarbus monument shows all foot soldiers in mail armour, it would appear that by c. 120 BC at the latest, mail was standard issue.

===== Helmets =====
Polybius does not describe in detail the helmets of heavy infantry. However, the Ahenobarbus friezes and archaeological discoveries show that the Montefortino type was prevalent. This was made of bronze, and only protected the face with cheek guards, so as not to obstruct soldiers' vision, hearing, breathing and shouting range. According to Polybius, the foot soldier adorned his helmet with three tall black or purple plumes to look taller and more awesome to the enemy. Other helmet types used was an Italian version of the Corinthian helmet. The latter had a face guard with two eye holes which could be lifted off the face when out of combat. But the Romans did not like face guards because they obstructed soldiers' senses. In the Italo-Corinthian helmet, the face guard was worn off the face at all times, although the eye holes were retained for decoration. Also used were Attic-type helmets, which were popular in Italy because they left the face unobstructed.

===== Shield =====
The heavy infantry shield (scutum) was a long oval in shape and convex, made of two layers of wood glued together, with canvas and calfskin covers and an iron boss at the centre. This provided very good overall protection and the boss could be used as a weapon, to be smashed in the face of the enemy.

===== Pilum =====
Polybius states that the three lines of heavy infantry were equipped with similar weapons and shields, save that the triarii were armed with a heavy thrusting-spear (hasta), while the hastati and principes held two pila (throwing javelins, singular form: pilum), one heavy, the other light. The pilum was a type of heavy javelin designed for launch at short range (15 m (49 ft) or less). It consisted of a wooden shaft with a long shank with barbed point affixed to one end, either attached by rivets or socketed into the shaft itself. The weapon thus had great penetrative power, as its weight, unusually high for a javelin, was channeled into a tiny point. It was designed to punch through an enemy's shield and penetrate the shield-bearer's body behind it. If successful, the enemy would be pinned to his shield and placed hors de combat. Even if the bearer was not struck, the barb on the pilum point would prevent him from removing it from his shield, rendering it useless.

Modern reconstruction of the heavy pilum according to Polybius' specifications has shown that it would have weighed some 8.5 kg (19 lb), far too heavy to be of any practical use as a throwing weapon. The light pilum would have weighed a more serviceable 2.2 kg (4.9 lb). The pilum used during the earlier period was not as sophisticated as the fully developed weapon used in the later Republic: it did not feature lead counterweights or a buckling shank until around 150 BC.

===== Gladius =====
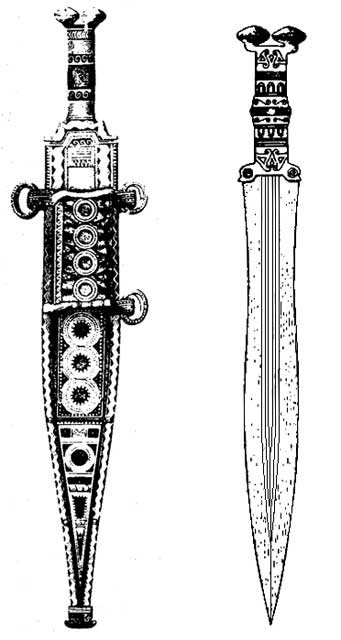
Drawing of one of the earliest known exemplars of the gladius design, from the Cogotas II culture of Iron Age Iberia (c. 700 BC).

The key weapon of the mid-republican soldier was the gladius Hispaniensis or 'Spanish sword', so-called because the basic design originated in Iberia. The few exemplars of republican gladii found show that these were significantly longer (and heavier) than those of the imperial period. Typical blade length was 60–68 cm (24–27 in), compared to 45–55 cm (18–22 in) in the 1st century AD. This made the early gladius suitable for use by cavalry as well as infantry. The characteristic shape of the gladius blade, narrowing in the middle to provide greater balance and stabbing force, was more pronounced in the Republican than imperial types. Although stabbing remained the preferred method of combat for the Romans, as it was far more likely to result in fatal wounds than slashing, the advantage of the gladius over the Italic sword types previously used by the Romans were that it could be used for slashing (with both edges) as well as more effective stabbing.

The gladius was made of the best quality steel then available, the chalybs Noricus, celebrated in Roman times, from the region of Noricum (Austria). The strength of iron is determined by its carbon content (the higher the content, the stronger the metal). The wrought iron produced in the Greco-Roman world generally contained only minimal traces of carbon and was too soft for tools and weapons. It thus needed to be carburised to at least 1.5% carbon content. The main Roman method of achieving this was to repeatedly heat the wrought iron to a temperature of over 800 °C (1,470 °F) (i.e. to "white heat") and hammer it in a charcoal fire, causing the iron to absorb carbon from the charcoal. This technique had been developed empirically, as there is no evidence that ancient iron producers understood the chemistry involved. The rudimentary methods of carburisation used rendered the quality of the iron ore critical to the production of good steel. The ore needed to be rich in manganese (an element which remains essential in modern steelmaking processes), but also to contain very little, or preferably zero, phosphorus, whose presence would compromise the steel's hardness. The ore mined in Carinthia (S. Noricum) fulfills both criteria to an unusual degree. The Celtic peoples of Noricum (predominantly the Taurisci tribe) empirically discovered that their ore made superior steel around 500 BC and established a major steel-making industry around it. At Magdalensberg, a major production and trading centre was established, where a large number of specialised blacksmiths crafted a range of metal products, especially weapons. The finished products were mostly exported southwards, to Aquileia, a Roman colony founded in 180 BC.

From 200 BC onwards, it appears that the tribes of Noricum were gradually united in a native Celtic kingdom, known to the Romans as the regnum Noricum, with its capital at an uncertain location called Noreia. Noricum became a key ally of the Roman Republic, providing a reliable supply of high-quality weapons and tools in return for Roman military protection. Although there was no formal treaty of military alliance, the Norici could count on Roman military support, as demonstrated in 113 BC, when a vast host of Teutones invaded Noricum. In response to a desperate appeal by the Norici, the Roman consul Gnaeus Papirius Carbo rushed an army over the Alps and attacked the Germans near Noreia (although, in the event, he was heavily defeated).

The gladius was structurally robust, very light for its size and superbly balanced, possessed razor-sharp blades and strong triangular point. It could wreak fearsome carnage: Livy relates the reaction of the Macedonians to the results of an early cavalry skirmish in the Second Macedonian War (200–197 BC): "The Macedonians were used to the relatively limited wounds caused by arrows and spears, as their traditional enemies were Greeks and Illyrians. When they saw the horrendous injuries inflicted with the Spanish sword – arms hacked off at the shoulder, heads entirely severed, bellies ripped open and guts hanging out – they realised the kind of weapons and the sort of enemy that they were up against, and a wave of fear spread through their ranks."

The light infantry (velites) wore no armour over their tunics. They wore a light helmet, probably of leather, covered by an animal skin such as a wolf skin, according to Polybius, and a small round shield (parma). They carried light javelins and a sword.

==== Tactics ====
For set-piece battles, in contrast the single massed line of the Early Roman army phalanx, the heavy infantry were usually drawn up in three lines (triplex acies). However, the vast majority of the heavy infantry (2,400 out of 3,000) were stationed in the front two lines, the hastati and principes. Contained in these lines were the younger recruits who were expected to do all the fighting. The rear line (triarii) was a reserve consisting of 600 older men who formed a line of last resort to provide cover for the front lines if they were put to flight (and also to prevent unauthorised retreat by the front ranks). It is thus more accurate to describe the Roman battle line as a double line (duplex acies) with a small third line of reserve. It is this double line that constituted the most significant change from the previous single-line phalanx. The three lines of maniples were drawn up in a chessboard pattern (dubbed quincunx by modern historians, after the Latin for the "5" on a dice cube, whose dots are so arranged). In front of the heavy infantry, would be stationed the legion's 1,200 velites. It appears that the velites were not members of the maniples, but for the purposes of battle, they were divided into 10 companies of 120 men, each under the command of a senior centurion of hastati.

The replacement, for the two front lines, of the thrusting spear with the thrown pilum implies a shift to a different tactic by the heavy infantry. The phalanx of spearmen was replaced by ranks of sword-fighters armed with javelins.

In the mid-republican army, the central tactic was a shock infantry charge, designed to put the enemy to flight as quickly as possible. Hastati legionaries would advance at a measured pace towards the enemy line. When the gap was only around 15 m (16 yd), each successive line of hastati would fling their two pila, draw their swords and break into a run, yelling their war cry and charging into the enemy line. Smashing the enemy in the face with their shield bosses, legionaries would use their gladii to stab the enemy in the groin, belly, or face, inflicting fatal wounds in the great majority of cases. Where the enemy was tribal and unarmoured, the initial impact alone frequently resulted in the collapse of the enemy line. Against advanced enemies such as the Greeks, the initial impact would at least disrupt the enemy line and, in the ensuing melee, the Romans would benefit from their improved weaponry.

=== Alae infantry ===
The socii were summoned to arms by a message from the consuls, ordering each ally to deliver a specified number of troops to a specified assembly place (one location for each consular army) by a set deadline. At the assembly point, where the legions would also muster, the allied troops would be allocated to an ala and placed under the command of Roman officers. Each consul would then arrive from Rome to assume command of their army.

Compared to the manipular legion, Polybius gives little detail about the structure of an allied ala. An ala contained the same number of infantry as a legion (i.e., 4,200 or 5,000). It was commanded by three Roman praefecti sociorum, appointed by the consuls, presumably with one acting as commander and the other two as deputies, as in the cavalry turmae. Reporting to the praefecti were the native commanders of each allied contingent, who were appointed by their own government. The allied infantry appears to have been divided into cohorts. The first mention of such units, which were eventually adopted by the legions (after the Social War), is in Livy's account of the Second Punic War. The size of the allied cohorts is uncertain, and may not originally have been standard units at all, but simply a generic term denoting the contingent from each socius. However, Livy's account of Scipio Africanus' operations in Spain during the Second Punic War mentions Italian allied units of 460, 500 and 600 men which he terms cohortes.

A select group of the best Italian allied troops, denoted milites extraordinarii ('special troops'), would be detailed to act as an escort brigade for the consul. They would normally number one-third of the alae cavalry and one-fifth of the infantry (i.e., in a normal consular army, 600 horse and about 1,800 foot soldiers). The extraordinarii were at the immediate disposal of the consul, and were allocated their own distinct position both in the line of march and in the marching camp (next to the praetorium). However, in battle, there is no evidence that the extraordinarii occupied a special position. Presumably, they fought in their alae, alongside the rest of the socii troops.

There is no reason to believe that heavy infantry in the alae was equipped any differently from the legions, nor that they fought in a significantly different way.

=== Cavalry ===
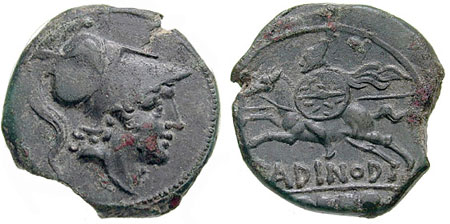
Roman coin issued during the Second Punic War (218–201 BC) showing (obverse) the god of war Mars and (reverse) probably the earliest image of a Roman cavalryman of the Republican era.

==== Levy and conditions of service ====
The legionary cavalry during this period was drawn exclusively from the two wealthiest classes, the equites and the first property class of commoners. The latter had started to be admitted to cavalry service when the equites were no longer sufficiently numerous to satisfy the needs of the cavalry. This may have occurred as early as 400 BC, and certainly by the time of the Samnite Wars, when the normal levy of Roman cavalry was doubled to 1,200 (four legions' contingent). According to Mommsen, First Class iuniores were all eventually required to join the cavalry.

As for infantry, pay was introduced for cavalrymen around 400 BC, set at a drachma per day, triple the infantry rate. Cavalrymen were liable to call-up for a maximum of ten campaigns up to age 46.

The Second Punic War placed unprecedented strains on Roman manpower, not least on the equites and the first class of commoners which provided the cavalry. During Hannibal's apocalyptic march through Italy (218–216 BC), thousands of Roman cavalrymen were killed in the field. The losses were especially serious for the equestrian order, which also provided the army's senior officers. Livy relates how, after Cannae, gold rings (a badge signifying equestrian rank), recovered from the corpses of Roman equites formed a pile one modius (about 9 litres) large. In the succeeding years 214–203 BC, the Romans kept at least 21 legions in the field at all times, in Italy and overseas, with a Roman cavalry requirement of 6,300. This would have required the depleted ranks of equites to provide at least 252 senior officers (126 tribuni militum, 63 decuriones and 63 praefecti sociorum), plus the army commanders (consuls, praetors, quaestors, proconsuls, etc.). It was probably from this time that equites became largely an officer class, while legionary cavalry was henceforth composed mainly of commoners of the first class.

==== Organization ====
Each Polybian legion contained a cavalry contingent of 300 horses, which does not appear to have been officered by an overall commander. The cavalry contingent was divided into 10 turmae (squadrons) of 30 men each. The squadron members would elect as their officers three decurions, of whom the first to be chosen would act as the squadron's commander and the other two as his deputies. In addition, each allied ala contained 900 horses, three times the size of the legionary contingent. The allies would thus supply three-quarters of a consular army's cavalry.

==== Equipment ====
Legionary cavalry underwent a transformation during this period, from the light, unarmoured horsemen of the early period to the Greek-style armoured cuirassiers described by Polybius. It appears that until c. 200 BC, Roman cavalrymen wore bronze breastplates, but after that time, mail became standard, with only officers retaining a breastplate. Most cavalrymen carried a spear (hasta) and the cavalry version of the small, round shield (parma equestris). However, it appears that in the late 2nd century BC, some cavalrymen carried long lances (contus), which would be held in both hands, precluding a shield.

==== Campaign record ====
There is a persistent view among some historians that the Romans of this period were inept at horsemanship and that their cavalry was simply a token adjunct to their far superior infantry. Indeed, some authors have even claimed that Roman cavalry preferred to fight on foot whenever possible, on the basis of a few incidents in which cavalry dismounted to assist their hard-pressed infantry colleagues. Against this, Sidnell argues that this view is misguided and that the record shows that Roman cavalry were a formidable force which won a high reputation for skill and valour in numerous battles of the 3rd century BC.

Roman cavalry of the Republican period specialised in the shock charge, followed by close melee combat. Examples include the Battle of Sentinum (295 BC), in which the cavalry played a crucial role in the Romans' crushing victory over an enormous combined army of Samnites and Gauls. On the left wing, the Romans twice drove back the more numerous and highly rated Gallic cavalry with spirited frontal charges, but pursued too far and became entangled in a melee with the enemy infantry. This gave the Gauls the opportunity to unleash on the Roman cavalry their chariot forces, whose unfamiliar deep rumbling noise panicked the Roman horses and resulted in a chaotic Roman flight. However, on the right, the Roman cavalry routed the Samnite infantry with a devastating charge on their flank. At Heraclea (280 BC), the Roman cavalry dismayed the enemy leader king Pyrrhus by gaining the advantage in a bitterly contested melee against his Thessalian professional cavalry, then regarded as the finest in the world, and were only driven back when Pyrrhus deployed his elephants, which panicked the Roman horses. At Telamon (225 BC), the Roman cavalry hotly contested a strategic hill on the flank of the battlefield with more numerous Gallic cavalry. In what developed as a separate cavalry battle before the main infantry engagement began, the Gauls were eventually driven off the hill by repeated Roman charges, enabling the Roman horse to launch a decisive flank attack on the Gallic foot. At the Battle of Clastidium, the Roman cavalry under Marcellus achieved a unique victory in overwhelming a larger force of Gallic horse and foot, without any aid of their infantry. On the eve of the Second Punic War, therefore, Roman cavalry was a prestigious and much feared force.

A key reason for some historians' disparagement of the Roman cavalry were the crushing defeats at the Trebia and at Cannae, that it suffered at the hands of the Carthaginian general Hannibal during the latter's invasion of Italy (218–216 BC). Sidnell points out these reverses were not due to poor performance by the Romans, who fought with their customary courage and tenacity, but to the Hannibalic cavalry's far superior numbers and the operational flexibility afforded by his Numidian light cavalry. Hannibal's already powerful cavalry (6,000 men) that he brought over the Alps, consisting of Hispanic heavy cavalry and Numidian light, was swollen by the adherence of most of the Gallic tribes of northern Italy, who provided an additional 4,000, bringing his horse up to 20% of his total force. At Cannae, 6,000 Roman horse (including Italian confederates) faced 10,000 Carthaginians, and on the Roman right wing, the Roman cavalry of 2,400 was probably outnumbered by more than two to one by Hannibal's Spaniards and Gauls. It is on this wing that the Roman disaster at Cannae was determined, as the Roman cavalry were overwhelmed and broken. In the words of Polybius: "As soon as the Spanish and Celtic horse on the (Carthaginian) left wing came into contact with the Roman cavalry... the fighting which developed was truly barbaric... Once the two forces had met they dismounted and fought on foot, man to man. Here the Carthaginians finally prevailed, and although the Romans resisted with desperate courage, most of them were killed..." The fact that the Romans dismounted has been used to support the thesis of a Roman cavalry that lacked confidence in its horsemanship and was in reality just a mounted infantry. But since the Carthaginian cavalry also dismounted, Livy's explanation is more credible, that fighting on horseback was impractical in the confined space between the right flank of the Roman infantry and the river Aufidus.

One reason for Hannibal's cavalry superiority was greater numbers. Whereas the Roman/Italian cavalry constituted about 12% of a confederate army, Carthaginian and Gallic cavalry were around 20% of their respective forces. It also became evident to the Romans that their exclusive reliance on heavy shock cavalry was insufficiently flexible. In addition to superior numbers, Hannibal's cavalry superiority was primarily based on his formidable light Numidian horse. Numidians rode their small but tough horses bareback, without bridles and unarmoured. They were armed simply with a few javelins and a light leather shield. They were exceptionally fast and manoeuvrable, ideal for scouting, skirmishing, harassment, ambushing and pursuit. Their standard tactic was to repeatedly approach the enemy, throw their javelins and then hastily scatter before the enemy could engage them. To this, the Romans, used to the charge followed by close melee combat, had no effective response. Nevertheless, in the years following Cannae (216–203 BC), the record of Roman cavalry in operations against Hannibal in southern Italy was creditable, scoring a number of successes in cavalry encounters although never depriving the enemy of overall cavalry superiority. The Romans finally succeeded in closing the light cavalry gap with the Carthaginians by winning over the Numidian king Massinissa, previously an ally of Carthage. This enabled the Romans to field at least an equal number of Numidians at the battle of Zama (202 BC), who, outnumbering the Roman/Italian cavalry by two to one, played a vital role in neutralising their compatriots fighting for Hannibal. Even so, it was the Roman cavalry that decided the issue, charging and routing the Carthaginians facing them, then wheeling to attack the Punic infantry in the rear.

==== Native allied cavalry ====
The cavalry of Roman armies before the Second Punic War had been exclusively Roman and confederate Italian, with each holding one wing of the battle line (the Romans usually holding the right wing). After that war, Roman/Italian cavalry was always complemented by allied native cavalry (especially Numidian), and was usually combined on just one wing. Indeed, the allied cavalry often outnumbered the combined Roman/Italian force e.g. at Zama, where the 4,000 Numidians held the right, with just 1,500 Romans/Italians on the left. One reason was the lessons learnt in the war, namely the need to complement heavy cavalry with plenty of light, faster horses, as well as increasing the cavalry share when engaging with enemies with more powerful mounted forces. It was also inevitable that, as the Roman Republic acquired an overseas empire and the Roman army now campaigned entirely outside Italy, the best of non-Italian cavalry would be enlisted in increasing numbers, including (in addition to Numidians) Gallic, Spanish and Thracian heavy cavalry.

Nevertheless, Roman and Italian confederate cavalry continued to form an essential part of a Roman army's line-up for over a century. They were especially effective in wars in the East, where they encountered Hellenistic Macedonian and Seleucid cavalry which fought in set-piece battles using equipment and tactics similar to the Romans' own. For example, at Magnesia (190 BC), 3,000 Roman cavalry on the right wing routed 7,000 facing Syrian and Greek cavalry (including 3,000 cataphracts – Parthian-style heavily armoured cavalry) then wheeled and assisted the legions in breaking the Seleucid phalanx by attacking it in the flank and rear. As earlier in the war against Hannibal, Roman cavalry was far less effective against elusive tribal light cavalry such as the Lusitanians under Viriathus in their bitter resistance to Roman rule (151–140 BC) and the Numidians themselves under king Jugurtha during the latter's rebellion (112–105 BC) During these conflicts, the Romans were obliged to rely heavily on their own Numidian allied horses.

== Marching order and camps ==
It is during this period of the Republic that a central feature of Roman military practice emerged, which was adhered to until at least c. AD 400 if not beyond: the fortified marching camp (castra), whose earliest detailed description is in Polybius. One Roman author claims that the Romans copied the design of their camps from those of king Pyrrhus, but this seems unlikely, as Polybius himself criticises his fellow-Greeks for not constructing fortified camps.

Roman troops would construct a fortified camp, with a standardised size and layout, at the end of each day's march. Most of their adversaries would rely on camping on defensible features (such as hilltops) or in places of concealment (such as in forests or swamps). Although this practice spared troops the toil of constructing fortifications, it would frequently result in camps often being situated on unsuitable ground (i.e., uneven, waterlogged or rocky) and vulnerable to surprise attack, if the enemy succeeded in scouting its location.

The advantages of fortified marching camps were substantial. Camps could be situated on the most suitable ground: i.e., preferably level, dry, clear of trees and rocks, and close to sources of drinkable water, forageable crops and good grazing for horses and pack animals. Properly patrolled, fortified camps made surprise attacks impossible and successful attacks rare – in fact, no case is recorded in the ancient literature of a Roman marching camp being successfully stormed. The security afforded by fortified camps permitted soldiers to sleep soundly, while animals, baggage and supplies were safely corralled within its precinct. If the army engaged an enemy near a marching camp, a small garrison of a few hundred men would suffice to defend the camp and its contents. In case of defeat, fleeing soldiers could take refuge in their marching camp. After their disaster on the battlefield of Cannae (216 BC), some 17,000 Roman troops (out of a total deployment of over 80,000) escaped death or capture by fleeing to the two marching-camps that the army had established nearby, according to Livy.

The process of establishing a marching camp would start when the consul in command of a consular army determined the general area where the day's march would terminate. A detail of officers (a military tribune and several centurions), known as the mensores ('measurers'), would be charged with surveying the area and determining the best location for the praetorium (the consul's tent), planting a standard on the spot. Measured from this spot, a square perimeter would be marked out from the praetorium. According to Polybius, the marching camp of a typical consular army of 20,000 men would measure 2150 Roman feet square (c. 700 m × 700 m (2,300 ft × 2,300 ft) = c. 50 ha (120 acres)). Along the perimeter, a ditch (fossa) would be excavated, and the spoil used to build an earthen rampart (agger) on the inside of the ditch. On top of the rampart was erected a palisade (vallum) of cross-hatched wooden stakes with sharpened points. Within this precinct, a standard, elaborate plan was used to allocate space, in a pre-set pattern, for the tents of each of the various components of the army: officers, legionary infantry (split into hastati, principes and triarii) and legionary cavalry, Italian allied infantry and cavalry, extraordinarii and non-Italian allies. The idea was that the men of each maniple would know exactly in which section of the camp to pitch their tents and corral their animals. The construction of a marching camp would take a consular army just a couple of hours, since most soldiers would participate and were equipped with picks and shovels for the purpose. Where both consular armies were marching together, a twin camp was established, back-to-back, so that the overall shape was rectangular.

== Social impact of military service ==
During the Samnite Wars, the military burden on the core social group was very onerous. The standard levy was raised from two to four legions and military operations took place every single year. This implies that c. 16% of all Roman adult males spent every campaigning season under arms in this period, rising to 25% during emergencies. But even this pales into insignificance compared to the demands on Roman manpower of the Second Punic War. Polybius estimates Roman citizen iuniores (excluding the Italian allies) at about 231,000 in 225 BC, on the eve of the war. Of these, some 50,000 perished in the great defeats of 218–206 BC. Of the remaining 180,000, the Romans kept at least 100,000 in the field, in Italy and overseas, continuously in the period 214–203 BC (and 120,000 in the peak year). In addition, about 15,000 were serving in the Roman fleets at the same time. Thus, if one assumes that fresh recruits reaching military age were cancelled out by campaign losses, fully two-thirds of Roman iuniores were under arms continuously during the war. This barely left enough to tend the fields and produce the food supply. Even then, emergency measures were often needed to find enough recruits. Livy implies that, after Cannae, the minimum property qualification for legionary service was largely ignored. In addition, the normal ban on criminals, debtors and slaves serving in the legions was lifted. Twice the wealthy class were forced to contribute their slaves to man the fleets and twice boys under military age were enlisted.

The century following the Second Punic War saw Rome's acquisition of an overseas empire, including major possessions in Africa, Spain, Illyricum and Greece. The Republic's army, however, retained much the same structure as before, a citizen levy alongside conscripts provided by the socii. The socii appear to have played their role in the new paradigm uncomplainingly, despite the fact that the confederation, previously an alliance primarily designed for mutual defence, was now engaged mostly in aggressive expansion overseas. Socii acquiescence was mainly bought by the generous share of booty that overseas campaigns brought to each socius soldier. In addition, the socii were becoming increasingly integrated with the Romans. Shared service in an army whose operational language was Latin resulted in the latter becoming the lingua franca of the peninsula, gradually eclipsing its other native languages. In the Roman provinces outside Italy, foreigners made no distinction between Romans and Italians and referred to both simply as "Romans". In Italy, ever more socii voluntarily adopted Roman systems of government, laws and coinage.

Yet, underneath the surface, resentment was steadily building among the Italian allies about their second-class status in the Roman system. In particular, not holding Roman citizenship, they were unable to benefit from the large-scale redistribution of Roman common land (ager publicus), from large landowners to smallholders, carried out by the Gracchi brothers starting in 133 BC. The agrarian reforms sparked a massive movement among the socii to demand full citizenship. It appears from the fragmentary evidence that the conservative majority in the Roman Senate succeeded, by both fair means and foul (such as assassinating reform leaders), in blocking any significant expansion of citizenship among the socii in the period following the agrarian law of 133 BC.

In 91 BC, the socii rebelled en masse against the Roman alliance system, sparking the so-called "Social War" (91–88 BC), probably the toughest challenge faced by Rome since the Second Punic War over a century earlier. The Romans ultimately prevailed, not only by military action but by conceding the very demands that had set off the revolt in the first place. In 89 BC, socii which had remained loyal were granted full Roman citizenship, and that privilege was extended to all inhabitants of the Italian peninsula shortly after the end of the war. This entailed the demise of the old allied alae, as the former socii, now citizens, were now recruited into the legions. The "Polybian" army gave way to the Roman army of the late Republic.

== See also ==
- Structural history of the Roman military
- Campaign history of the Roman military
- List of Roman army unit types

== Bibliography ==
=== Ancient ===
- Caesar De Bello Gallico (50 BC)
- Livy, Ab Urbe Condita (c. AD 20)
- Plutarch Parallel Lives
- Polybius, Histories (c. 150 BC)
- Vegetius, De Re Militari (c. AD 400)

=== Modern ===
- Bishop, M.C. and Coulston, C.N. (2006): Roman Military Equipment
- Brunt, P. A. (1971): Italian Manpower
- Buchwald, Vagn (2005): Iron and Steel in Ancient Times
- Cambridge Ancient History (CAH) 2nd Ed Vol VII (1989): Rome and Italy in the early 3rd century BC
- Cambridge Ancient History (CAH) 2nd Ed Vol VIII (1989):
- Cary & Scullard (1980): History of Rome
- Cornell, T. J. (1995): The Beginnings of Rome
- Dobson, Michael (2008): The Army of the Roman Republic: the 2nd Century BC
- Eckstein, A. M. (2006): Mediterranean Anarchy, Interstate War and the Rise of Rome
- Fields, Nic (2007): The Roman Army of the Punic Wars 264–146 BC (Osprey Publishing)
- Goldsworthy, A. (2000): Roman Warfare
- Goldsworthy, A. (2001): Cannae
- Goldsworthy, A. (2003): The Complete Roman Army
- Machado, Dominic M. (2023). Voluntas Militum: community, collective action, and popular power in the armies of the middle republic (300–100 BCE) (1 ed.). Sevilla: Editorial Universidad de Sevilla. ISBN 9788413406381.
- Healy, F. (1978): Mining and Metallurgy in the Greek and Roman Worlds
- Roth, Johnathan (1998): Logistics of the Roman Army at War (246 BC – AD 235)
- Roth, Johnathan (2009): Roman Warfare
- Scullard, H. H. (1984): A History of the Roman World
- Sidnell, P. (2006): Warhorse: Cavalry in Ancient Warfare
- Wallbank, F.W. (1957): A Historical Commentary on Polybius Vol I
