= Early Roman army =

The early Roman army was deployed by ancient Rome during its Regal Era and into the early Republic around 300 BC, when the so-called "Polybian" or manipular legion was introduced.

Until c. 550 BC, there was probably no "national" Roman army, but a series of clan-based war-bands, which only coalesced into a united force in periods of serious external threat. Around 550 BC, during the period conventionally known as the rule of King Servius Tullius, it appears that a universal levy of eligible adult male citizens was instituted. This development apparently coincided with the introduction of heavy armour for most of the infantry.

The early Roman army was based on a compulsory levy from adult male citizens that was held at the start of each campaigning season, in those years that war was declared. There were probably no standing or professional forces. During the Regal Era (to c. 500 BC), the standard levy was probably of 9,000 men, consisting of 6,000 heavily armed infantry (probably Greek-style hoplites), plus 2,400 light-armed infantry (rorarii, later called velites) and 600 light cavalry (equites celeres). When the kings were replaced by two annually-elected Consuls in c. 500 BC, the standard levy remained of the same size, but was now divided equally between the Consuls, each commanding one legion of 4,500 men.

It is likely that the hoplite element was deployed in a Greek-style phalanx formation in large set-piece battles. However, these were relatively rare, with most fighting consisting of small-scale border-raids and skirmishing. In these, the Romans would fight in their basic tactical unit, the centuria of 100 men. In addition, clan-based forces remained in existence until at least c. 450 BC, although they would operate under the Consuls' authority, at least nominally.

In 493 BC, shortly after the establishment of the Roman Republic, Rome concluded a perpetual treaty of military alliance (the Foedus Cassianum), with the combined other Latin city-states. The treaty, probably motivated by the need for the Latins to deploy a united defence against incursions by neighbouring hill-tribes, provided for each party to provide an equal force for campaigns under unified command. It remained in force until 358 BC.

== Background: early Rome (to 338 BC) ==
=== Socio-political developments ===
According to Roman legend, Rome was founded by Romulus in 753 BC. However, the vast amount of archaeological evidence uncovered since the 1970s suggests that Rome did not assume the characteristics of a united city-state (as opposed to a group of separate hilltop settlements) before around 625 BC. The same evidence has also conclusively discredited A. Alfoldi's once-fashionable theory that Rome was an insignificant settlement until c. 500 BC (and that, consequently, the Republic was not established before c. 450 BC). There is now no doubt that Rome was a major city in the period 625–500 BC, when it had an area of c. 285 hectares and an estimated population of 35,000. This made it the second-largest in Italy (after Tarentum) and about half the size of contemporary Athens (585 hectares, inc. Piraeus).

Few scholars today dispute that Rome was ruled by kings in its archaic period, although whether any of the seven names of kings preserved by tradition are historical remains uncertain (Romulus himself is generally regarded as mythical). It is also likely that there were several more kings than those preserved by tradition, given the long duration of the regal era (even if it did start in 625 rather than 753 BC). The Roman monarchy, although an autocracy, did not resemble a medieval monarchy. It was not hereditary and based on "divine right", but elective and subject to the ultimate sovereignty of the people. The king (rex, from root-verb regere, literally means simply "ruler") was elected for life by the people's assembly (the comitia curiata originally) although there is strong evidence that the process was in practice controlled by the patricians, a hereditary aristocratic caste. Most kings were non-Romans brought in from abroad, doubtless as a neutral figure who could be seen as above patrician factions (somewhat like the podestà in medieval Italian cities). Although a king's blood-relations could succeed him, they were still required to submit to election. The position and powers of a Roman king were thus similar to those of Julius Caesar when he was appointed dictator-for-life in 44 BC and indeed of the succeeding Roman emperors.

According to Roman tradition, in 616 BC, an Etruscan named Lucumo, from the town of Tarquinii, was elected king of Rome as Lucius Tarquinius I. He was succeeded by his son-in-law, Servius Tullius, and then by his son, Lucius Tarquinius II. The establishment of this "dynasty" of Etruscan origin has led some earlier historians to claim that late regal Rome was occupied by troops from Tarquinii militarily and culturally Etruscanised. But this theory has been dismissed as a myth by Cornell and other more modern historians, who point to the extensive evidence that Rome remained politically independent, as well as linguistically and culturally a Latin city. In relation to the army, the Cornell faction argue that the introduction of heavy infantry in the late regal era followed Greek, not Etruscan, models.

It seems certain that the monarchy was overthrown in c. 500 BC and replaced by some form of collegiate rule. It is likely that the revolution that overthrew the Roman monarchy was engineered by the patrician caste and that its aim was not, as rationalised later by ancient authors, the establishment of a democracy, but of a patrician-dominated oligarchy. The proverbial "arrogance" and "tyranny" of the Tarquins, epitomised by the rape of Lucretia incident, is probably a reflection of the patricians' fear of the Tarquins' growing power and their erosion of patrician privilege, most likely by drawing support from the plebeians (commoners). To ensure patrician supremacy, the autocratic power of the kings had to be fragmented and permanently curtailed. Thus the replacement of a single ruler by a collegiate administration, which soon evolved into two praetores (Praetors, renamed Consuls in 305 BC), with equal powers and limited terms of office (one year, instead of the life tenancy of the kings). In addition, power was further fragmented by the establishment of further collegiate offices, known to history as Roman magistrates: three aediles and four quaestors. Patrician supremacy was assured by restricting the eligibility to hold the Republican offices to just patricians.

The establishment of a hereditary oligarchy obviously excluded wealthy non-patricians from political power and it is this class that led plebeian opposition to the early Republican settlement. The early Republic (510–338 BC) saw a long and often bitter struggle for political equality, known as the Conflict of the Orders, against the patrician monopoly of power. The plebeian leadership had the advantage that they represented the vast majority of the population and of their own growing wealth. By 338 BC, the privileges of the patricians had become largely ceremonial (such as the exclusive right to hold certain state priesthoods). But this does not imply a more democratic form of government. The wealthy plebeians who had led the "plebeian revolution" had no more intention of sharing real power with their poorer and far more numerous fellow-plebeians than did the patricians. It was probably at this time (around 300 BC) that the population was divided, for the purposes of taxation and military service, into seven classes based on an assessment of their property. The two top classes, numerically the smallest, accorded themselves an absolute majority of the votes in the main electoral and legislative assembly. Oligarchy based on birth had been replaced by oligarchy based on wealth.

=== External relations ===
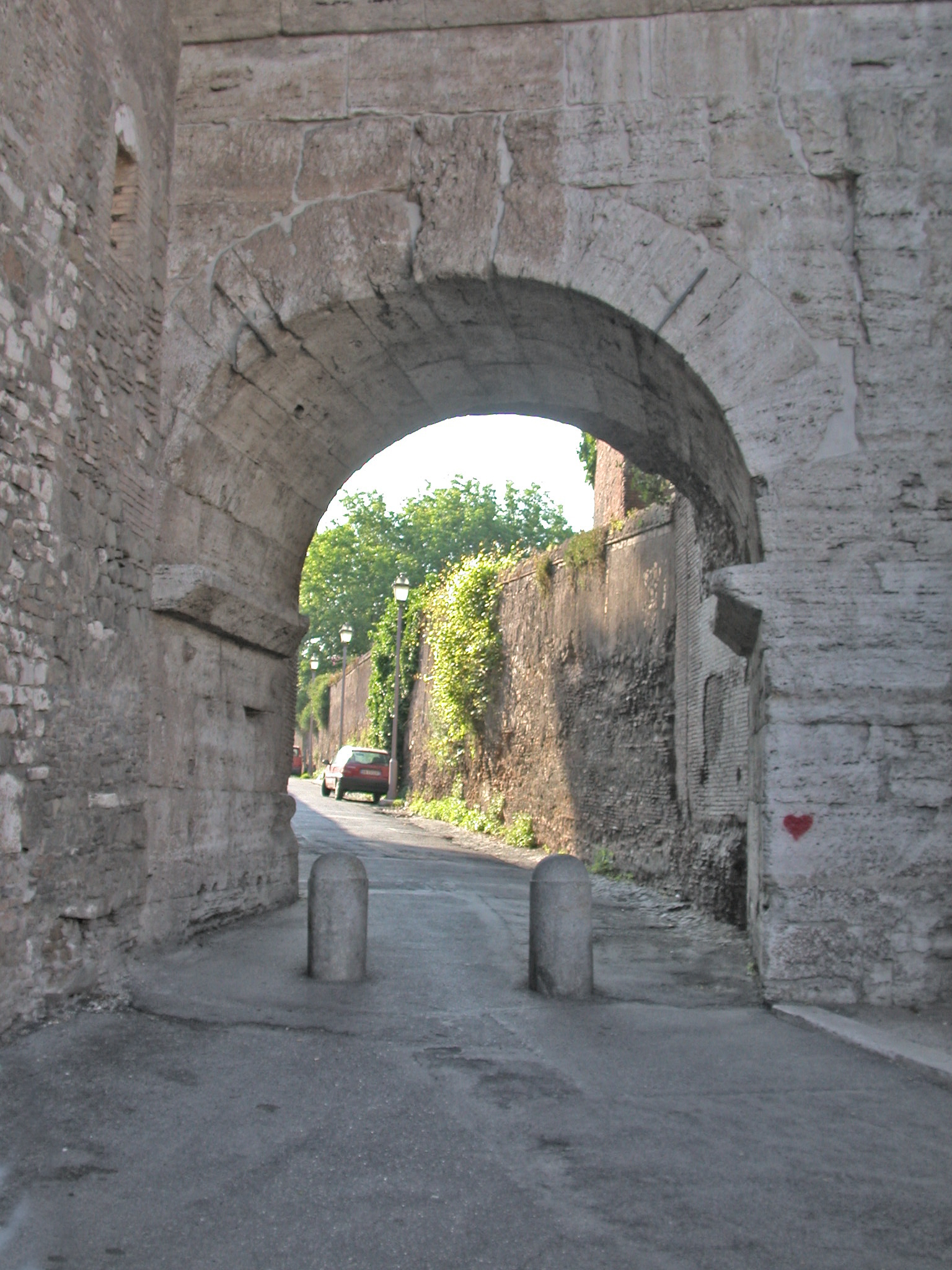
Gate of the so-called "Servian Wall", Caelian Hill, Rome. The wall, made of massive tufa stone blocks, was built shortly after Rome was sacked by the Gauls in 390 BC. Several sections survive to this day

It appears likely that Rome in the period 550–500 BC, conventionally known as the period that it was ruled by the Tarquin dynasty, established its hegemony over the other Latin city-states of Old Latium, which may have been required to pay tribute. The fall of the Roman monarchy was followed by a war with the Latins, who probably took advantage of the political turmoil in Rome to attempt to regain their independence. The Romans apparently prevailed, scoring a notable victory over the Latin forces at Lake Regillus sometime between 499 and 493 BC.

But instead of restoring their previous hegemony, the Romans settled for a military alliance on apparently equal terms with the Latins. According to the sources, the foedus Cassianum was a bilateral treaty between the Romans and the Latin city-states. The impetus to form such an alliance was probably provided by the acute insecurity caused by a phase of migration and invasion of the lowland areas by Italic tribes occupying the mountains surrounding Old Latium, notably the Aequi and Volsci, in the period after 500 BC.

The new Romano-Latin military alliance proved strong enough to repel the incursions of the Italic mountain tribes, but it was a very tough struggle. Intermittent wars, with mixed fortunes, continued until c. 395 BC. The Sabines disappear from the record in 449 BC (presumably subjugated by the Romans), while campaigns against the Aequi and Volsci seem to have reached a turning point with the major Roman victory on Mount Algidus in 431 BC. In the same period, the Romans fought three wars against their nearest neighbouring Etruscan city-state, Veii, finally reducing the city in 396 BC, probably increasing the ager Romanus (Roman territory) by c. 65%.

At this juncture, Rome was crushed by an invasion of central Italy by the Gallic Senones tribe. Routed in the Battle of the River Allia in 386 BC, the Roman army fled to Veii, leaving their city at the mercy of the Gauls, who proceeded to ransack it and then demand a huge ransom in gold to leave. The effects of this disaster on Roman power are a matter of controversy between scholars. The ancient authors emphasize the catastrophic nature of the damage, claiming that it took a long time for Rome to recover. Cornell, however, argues that the ancients greatly exaggerated the effects and cites the lack of archaeological evidence for major destruction and the building of the so-called "Servian" Wall as evidence that Rome recovered swiftly. The wall, whose 11 km-circuit enclosed 427 hectares (an increase of 50% over the Tarquinian city) was a massive project that would have required an estimated five million man-hours to complete, implying plentiful financial and labour resources. Against this, Eckstein argues that the history of Rome in the fifty years subsequent to 386 BC appears a virtual replay of the previous century. There were wars against the same enemies except Veii (i.e. the Volsci, Aequi, and Etruscans) in the same geographical area, and indeed against other Latin city-states, such as Praeneste and Tibur, just 30 miles away. In addition, a treaty concluded with Carthage in c. 348 BC seems to describe Rome's sphere of control as much the same area as in a previous treaty signed in the first years of the Republic 150 years earlier: just Old Latium, and not even all of that.

This phase of Roman history ended with the Latin War (341–338 BC). The Latin city-states, acting collectively as the Latin League, tried to withdraw from their military alliance with Rome, for fear of the latter's ever-growing political dominance. But the Romans scored a decisive victory and the Latin city-states were either annexed into Roman territory or tied into satellite status.

== Army evolution ==
The early Roman army is shrouded by a lack of evidence. Ancient historians' accounts of the history of Rome before it was sacked by the Gauls in 386 BC (390 by Roman reckoning) are regarded as highly unreliable by modern historians. Livy, the main surviving ancient source on the early period, himself admits that the pre-386 period is very obscure and that his own account is based on legend rather than written documentation, as the few written documents that did exist in the earlier period were mostly lost in the Gallic fire.

=== Early regal era (to c. 550 BC) ===
In the earliest times, when Rome still consisted of separate hilltop settlements, and into the earlier regal period until c. 550 BC, it is likely that there was no "Roman army" in the conventional sense, but war-bands based on the Roman gentes (clans), led by their clan-leaders e.g. the war-band of the Fabii, which, according to Livy numbered 306 cognati et sodales ("kinsmen and supporters") in 479 BC. In this era, the predominant "warfare" consisted of chronic small-scale raiding and cattle-rustling against other clans and, later, neighbouring hill-tribes such as the Sabini and Aequi. Only occasionally did the clan war-bands join together to form a larger force, in order to face a major threat from neighbouring tribes. It is likely that the heroic tales in Livy's first three books derive from old ballads celebrating such raids, orally transmitted through the generations within aristocratic clans. At this time, it is likely that Roman warriors, both foot and mounted, were unarmoured, carrying only light shields and leather helmets.

=== Later regal era (c. 550 – c. 500 BC) ===
It appears that the "Early Roman army" in the sense of an organised national force with standard equipment did not become established before the period 600-500 BC, when both the ancient chroniclers and archaeology indicate major changes in organisation and equipment.

==== Infantry ====
The critical changes were the adoption by the infantry of Greek-style hoplite equipment, most likely borrowed from the Greek colonies of southern Italy (Magna Graecia), featuring metal body-armour; and the concomitant differentiation of the section of the citizen-body who were wealthy enough to pay for such equipment (known as the classis, or "class") from those who were not and continued to serve as unarmoured light infantry (infra classem, or "beneath the class").

According to Livy, Romulus (traditional reign dates: 753–717 BC) raised ten centuriae (military units of 100 men) of infantry from each of the three original "tribes" of Rome which he had founded - the Ramnes, Tities and Luceres. (Although the Latin term tribus - literally "in three parts" - is conventionally translated as "tribe", the term "constituency" would be more precise, as they were artificial divisions for administrative purposes. The Romans always used the terms gentes or nationes to mean "tribes" in the sense of ethnic groups). But the establishment of these centuriae (and even of the tribes themselves) is probably anachronistic, and in reality dates from much later in the regal era, probably in the period 600-550 BC.

The initial 30 centuriae were then doubled to 60 in the period around 550 BC, according to the scholar P. Fraccaro's interpretation of the so-called Servian centuriate organisation. (Note: Servian centuriate organisation: Livy claims that king Servius Tullius (traditional dates: 578-536 BC) divided the Roman citizen-body into 5 classes based on assessed wealth for the purposes of infantry service, specifying the equipment that recruits from each class were required to wear, to be paid for from their own resources. Each class was supposedly expected to supply a specified number of centuriae to the levy. However, Livy's scheme would have resulted in the majority of the total levy being raised from the two top property classes, which were numerically tiny, a nonsensical proposition. Scholars agree that the centuriae referred to by Livy must have been political, rather than military, divisions and cannot have been introduced until much later (although their actual date of introduction remains controversial, with suggestions ranging from c. 400 BC to c. 200 BC). Furthermore, the equipment details for each class given by Livy are probably garbled, although their broad thrust, that a majority of the levy were now equipped as hoplites, is supported by the archaeological evidence.) Fraccaro suggests that the Servian army consisted of a single legion of 6,000 hoplites, plus 2,400 velites (unarmoured infantry) and 600 cavalry. Until recently, Fraccaro's thesis was not widely accepted because of Alfoldi's view of an "insignificant" early Rome, which could not have supported such a powerful army (or cavalry). But with a population now estimated at 35,000 inhabitants, a regal military levy of 9,000 is plausible, and the Fraccaro interpretation has won wide acceptance among modern scholars of ancient Rome. It implies that the "Servian" citizen-body was divided into just three property-classes for military service: patricians for cavalry service, landowning peasants for service (collectively known as the classis) as hoplites and others for service as velites (infra classem, or "beneath the class").

==== Cavalry ====
Romulus supposedly established a cavalry regiment of 300 men called the Celeres ("the Swift Squadron") to act as his personal escort, with each of the three tribes supplying 100 horse. This cavalry regiment was supposedly doubled in size to 600 men by King Tarquinius Priscus (conventional dates 616-578 BC). That the cavalry was increased to 600 during the regal era is likely, as in the early Republic the cavalry fielded remained 600-strong (two legions with 300 horses each). However, according to Livy, king Servius Tullius established a further 12 centuriae of equites, a further tripling of the cavalry. But this is probably anachronistic, as it would have resulted in a contingent of 1,800 horses, incongruously large since the heavy infantry was only 6,000-strong. Instead, the additional 12 centuriae were probably created at a later stage, perhaps around 400 BC, but these new units were political not military, most likely designed to admit plebeians to the Order of Knights.

An important question is whether the royal cavalry was drawn exclusively from the ranks of the patricians. This is certainly the mainstream view among historians, starting with Mommsen, but Cornell considers the supporting evidence tenuous. If the cavalry was indeed a patrician preserve in the regal era, it probably played a critical part in the coup against the monarchy. Indeed, Alfoldi suggests that the coup was carried out by the Celeres themselves.

=== Early Republic (c. 500 – c. 300 BC) ===
According to the Fraccaro hypothesis, when the Roman monarchy was replaced by two praetores in c. 500 BC, the royal legion was divided into two (one for each praetor), each legion comprising 3,000 hoplites. The velites and cavalry were also split equally (1,200 velites and 300 cavalry each), for a total of 4,500 men. This remained the normal size of a Republican legion until the end of the Social War (88 BC). However, Livy states that a legion at the time of Marcus Furius Camillus (early 4th century BC) consisted of only 3,000 infantry and 300 cavalry.

Around 400 BC, according to Livy, important reforms were made. Pay was introduced for levies under arms, both infantry and cavalry (at 1/3 and one drachma per day respectively). Although modest, infantry pay was at least sufficient to cover food rations, clothing and miscellaneous equipment (other than weapons and armor), which until then had been borne by the soldier.

A seminal innovation of the young Republic was the establishment, in c. 493 BC, of an indefinite military alliance with the other city-states of Old Latium, the home of the Latin tribe, to which the Romans themselves belonged. The so-called foedus Cassianum ("Treaty of Cassius") was a mutual non-aggression and defense pact. It required all signatories to assist any of their number who was attacked with all their forces. It also appears to have provided for joint operations in the field. Judging by the provision that the Romans and Latins were to share booty on an equal basis, it is likely that the treaty required the Latins to contribute roughly the same number of troops to joint operations as Rome. It appears that allied strategy was determined by an annual conference and that command of any joint forces may have alternated between Romans and allies. The treaty remained in force until 358 BC and effectively doubled Rome's military potential to c. 18,000 troops, a huge size for Italian armies of the time.

=== Transformation into manipular Roman army (c. 300 – 264 BC) ===
Scholars generally believe that the transformation of the early army into the "manipular" army of the mid-Republic took place during the Samnite Wars (which ended in 290 BC).

From this time onwards, instead of fielding a phalanx for battle, the Romans deployed a series of small tactical units called manipuli (maniples), arrayed in three lines (triplex acies) in a chessboard pattern (quincunx). The maniples were basically the old centuriae, reconfigured so that those deployed in the front two lines of triplex acies were 20 men larger (120 men) and those in the rear line were reduced to 60 men each. The quincunx offered much greater flexibility and maneuvrability than the large, dense mass of a phalanx. It is believed that the Romans copied the quincunx from their adversaries, the Samnites.

Other major changes occurred around this time. The demands of the struggle with the Samnites led to the doubling of the normal Roman military levy, from two to four legions. In addition, the defunct alliance (foedus Cassianum) with the other Latin cities was replaced, probably during this period, by a new military alliance embracing all the states, Latin or non-Latin, that the Romans had subdued by then (called the socii, or "allies"). Unlike the foedus, which was a multilateral treaty (or bilateral between Rome and all the other Latin states together), the new arrangements were based on bilateral treaties between Rome and each of a large number of allies. The new system was probably much more Roman-dominated than the foedus. Strategy was determined by the Roman Senate alone, joint forces were always levied and command of joint forces was to be always in Roman hands. These measures quadrupled the size of a normal consular army, from c. 5,000 to c. 20,000 men.

This period is also regarded by some historians as the most likely time for the introduction of the "Servian" centuriate organization which underpinned the military levy. The period also saw the introduction of new equipment, including armour for the cavalry and chain-mail armor, the gladius (a sword of Spanish design) and the pilum (a heavy javelin) for the infantry.

== Equipment ==
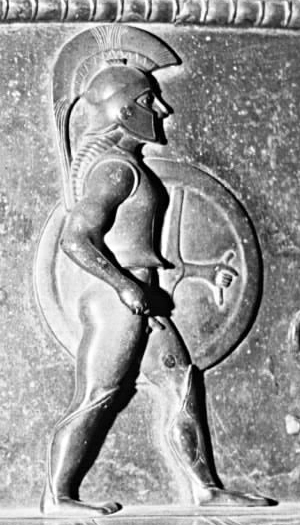
Relief of a Spartan hoplite, c. 510 BC. Detail from the Vix bronze krater, Musée du Pays Châtillonnais, France

On the basis of Etruscan representations, it has been widely accepted that the main early Roman infantry type was an armoured hoplite. These hoplite would probably have worn bronze helmets, breastplate and greaves and a round leather or large circular bronze-plated wooden shield. They were armed with a spear, sword and dagger.

According to the ancient Greek historian Polybius, whose Histories (written c. 140s BC) are the earliest substantial extant account of the Republic, Roman cavalry was originally unarmoured, wearing only a tunic and armed with a light spear and ox-hide shield which were of low quality and quickly deteriorated in action.

== Tactics ==
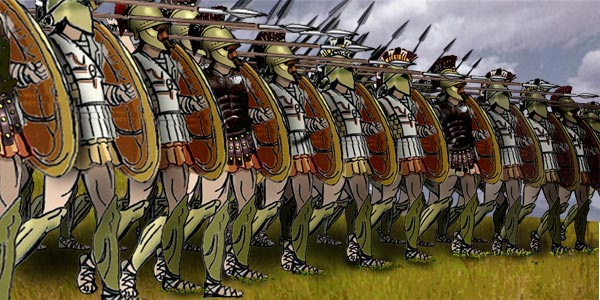
Reconstruction of Greek hoplites in Phalanx formation c. 480 BC

As it appears that early Roman heavy infantry were armed as Greek-style hoplites, so it is assumed that it followed the Greek practice of fighting in a "phalanx formation". This was a deep (eight ranks or more), densely packed formation of heavily armoured spearmen, developed in Greece in the 7th century BC. The phalanx would aim to charge and break through the enemy line. Fighting was in tight formation, stabbing with the spear. Phalanx fighting required extensive training, as holding formation was critical to success.

Goldsworthy points out, however, that the phalanx was only suitable for large-scale set-piece battles. It was impractical for the small-scale raiding and skirmishing that remained the most frequent type of fighting that Rome was involved in during this period. Despite the establishment of a national levy in the Regal Era, aristocratic war-bands continued to play a role into the first decades of the Republic e.g. the war-band of the Fabii, which in 479 BC was charged by the praetores with guarding Roman territory against raids from the neighbouring Etruscan city of Veii (only to be ambushed by the Veientines and wiped out, supposedly leaving only one Fabius alive to perpetuate the clan). In these minor operations, a smaller tactical unit would have been essential and there is no reason to doubt that it was the centuria. Most likely in the regal period it actually consisted of 100 men, as its name implies. Light infantry (velites) and cavalry would also have been important in small-scale skirmishes.

== See also ==
- Roman army
- Structural history of the Roman military
