= Ensign (rank) =

Lowest-ranking commissioned officer, etymologically the carrier of the ensign flag

Ensign (/ˈɛnsən/; Late Middle English, from Old French enseigne ["mark", "symbol", "signal"; "flag", "standard", "pennant"], from Latin insignia [plural]) is a junior rank of a commissioned officer in the armed forces of some countries, normally in the infantry or navy.

As the junior officer in an infantry regiment was traditionally the carrier of the regimental colours, the rank acquired the name "ensign". This rank has generally been replaced in army ranks by second lieutenant. An ensign was generally the lowest-ranking commissioned officer, except where the rank of subaltern existed.

In contrast, the Arab rank of ensign (لواء, liwa'), as the word is usually rendered into English, is not the carrier of a unit's ensign but the commander of that unit, and is today the equivalent of major general.

According to Thomas Venn's 1672 Military and Maritime Discipline in Three Books, an ensign's duties included not only carrying the colors but assisting the captain and lieutenant of a company and, in their absence, exercising their authority.

"Ensign" is enseigne in French, and chorąży in Polish, each of which derives from a term for a flag. The same origin is the Soviet and the Russian rank of praporshchik, which was the top non-commissioned rank. The Spanish alférez and Portuguese alferes is a junior-officer rank below lieutenant associated with carrying the flag, and so is often translated as "ensign". Unlike the rank in other languages, the Spanish and Portuguese etymology has nothing to do with flags, but instead comes from the Arabic for "cavalier" or "knight".

Fähnrich, in German, comes from an older German military title, Fahnenträger (flag-bearer); however, it is an officer-cadet rank, not a junior officer. The same applies to the Dutch vaandrig, which has a parallel etymology.

The Finnish vänrikki derives from the same Germanic root word through the Swedish fänrik, but denotes the lowest rank of reserve officer in the Finnish ground forces, and is distinct from cadet ranks.

In the Swedish armed forces, fänrik is the lowest commissioned rank.

In the German Landsknecht armies (c. 1480), there existed the equivalent rank of cornet, for a man who carried the troop standard (known as a "cornet"). The cognate Dutch term kornet is still used in the Netherlands' artillery and cavalry units.

== Canada ==
In the Royal Canadian Navy, as explained below, the ranks Enseigne de vaisseau de 1re classe and Enseigne de vaisseau de 2e classe are the French equivalents for Sub-Lieutenant and Acting Sub-Lieutenant, respectively.

In the Canadian Army, Ensign (Enseigne) is the distinctive rank for Second-Lieutenant in the Guards Regiments.

== Estonia ==
In Estonian Defence Forces the equivalent of “ensign” is lipnik. It is used mainly as a rank for reserve officers.

== French speaking countries ==
During the Ancien régime in France, as in other countries, the ensign (enseigne) was the banner of an infantry regiment. As in other countries, the name began to be used for the officers who carried the ensign. The rank was renamed sub-lieutenant (sous-lieutenant) at the end of the 18th century. The Navy used a rank of ship-of-the-line ensign (enseigne de vaisseau), which was the lowest officer rank. It was briefly renamed ship-of-the-line sub-lieutenant (sous-lieutenant de vaisseau) in the end of the 18th century, but its older name was soon restored.

In many French-speaking countries, the rank is still used in the naval forces, usually split into a first and a second class (Enseigne de vaisseau de 1^{re} classe and Enseigne de vaisseau de 2^{e} classe respectively).

== New Zealand ==
The Royal New Zealand Navy, unlike the Royal Navy – whose uniforms, insignia, and traditions it inherited – created the ensign grade to equal the lowest commissioned RNZAF grade of pilot officer and the New Zealand Army grade of second lieutenant. It ranks above the grade of midshipman. Like the grade of pilot officer, it uses a single thin strip of braid.

The fact that the Royal Navy has no real equivalent to the lowest commissioned Royal Air Force and British Army grades was one of the driving factors behind the RNZN's decision to create the ensign grade. Another was that, at the time, New Zealand was actively involved with the United States Armed Forces, so it made sense to balance the rank system out with that used by the United States Navy.

== United Kingdom ==
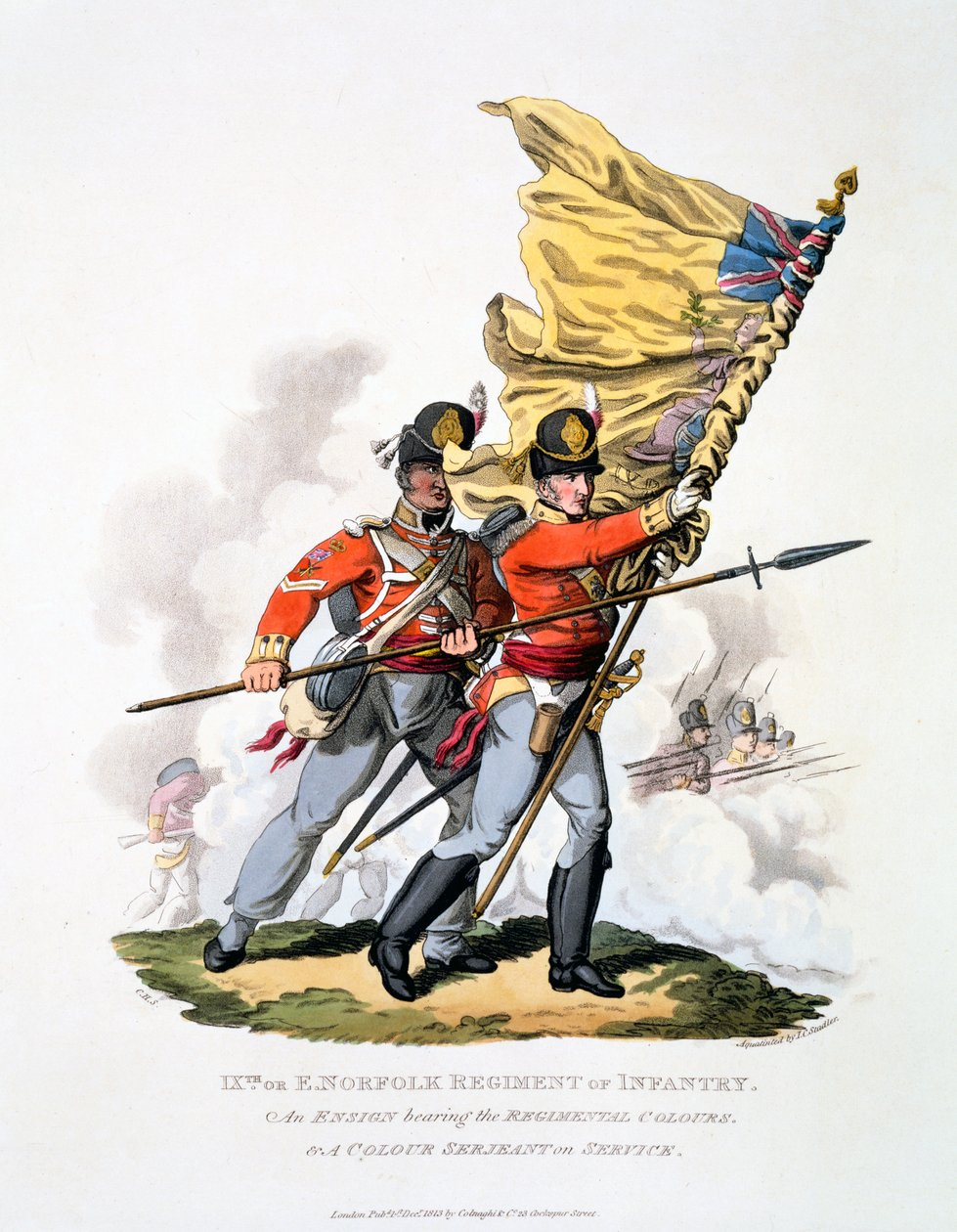
1813 engraving of an ensign (right) of the 9th Regiment of Foot

Until 1871, when it was replaced by second lieutenant, ensign was the lowest rank of commissioned officer in infantry regiments of the British Army (except fusilier and rifle regiments, and the Marines, which always used second lieutenant). It was the duty of officers of this rank to carry the colours of the regiment. In the 16th century, "ensign" was corrupted into "ancient", and was used in the two senses of a banner and the bearer of the banner, e.g. Ancient Pistol. Today, the term "ensign" is still used by the Foot Guards regiments, for instance during the ceremony of trooping the colour. The equivalent cavalry rank was cornet, also being derived from the name of a banner.

1856 to 1871 British Ensign's collar rank insignia

== United States ==
Ensign
- Navy and Coast Guard insignia

- PHS and NOAA insignia
- Country: United States
- Service branch: United States Navy; United States Coast Guard; United States Public Health Service Commissioned Corps; NOAA Commissioned Officer Corps; US Maritime Service
- Abbreviation: ENS
- Rank group: Junior officer
- NATO rank code: OF-1
- Pay grade: O-1
- Formation: 1789 (Army); 1862 (Navy)
- Abolished: 1815 (Army)
- Next higher rank: Lieutenant (junior grade)
- Next lower rank: Master chief petty officer
- Equivalent ranks: Second lieutenant

=== Army ===
The rank of ensign was established in the U.S. Army by the act of September 29, 1789 (the first act of legislation after the adoption of the U.S. Constitution); each of the eight companies in the Regiment of Infantry was authorized one captain, one lieutenant and one ensign. With the passage of the act of April 30, 1790, the number of companies in the regiment of infantry was increased to 12 and each of the companies was authorized the same number of officers. The act of March 3, 1791 added a second regiment to the Army strength, doubling the total number of ensigns.

With the organization of the Legion of the United States authorized by the act of March 5, 1792, ensigns were retained in the companies of infantry and were included in the authorized strength of companies of rifles; in addition, cornets were added to the companies of dragoons.

The ranks of ensign and cornet were abolished in the United States Army in the Army Organization Act of 1815.

=== Navy ===
In the United States Navy, the rank of ensign superseded passed midshipman in 1862. Ensign is the junior commissioned officer rank in the United States Navy, the United States Coast Guard, the United States Public Health Service Commissioned Corps, and the National Oceanic and Atmospheric Administration Commissioned Officer Corps. This rank is also used in the U.S. Maritime Service and the U.S. Naval Sea Cadet Corps. Ensign ranks below lieutenant junior grade, and it is equivalent to a second lieutenant in the U.S. Army, the Marine Corps, and the Air Force.

Where a newly commissioned ensign is assigned in the Navy is dependent on status as either an unrestricted line, restricted line, limited duty officer, or staff corps officer. For unrestricted line officers, depending on assignment to which warfare community, prospective Surface Warfare Officers (SWO) will spend 22 weeks at Surface Warfare Officer School followed by assignment to a warship for qualification as a SWO. Prospective Submarine Warfare Officers will attend Naval Nuclear Power School for 26 weeks, followed by Nuclear Power Training Unit (Prototype) for 24 weeks and Submarine Officer Basic Course for 12 weeks before reporting to their first submarine. Prospective Naval Aviators and Naval Flight Officers have a 12 to 18 month flight training track to earn their wings, followed by a six to nine-month training track in a Fleet Replacement Squadron before being assigned to fly combat aircraft in a deployable Fleet aviation squadron. Sea-Air-Land (SEAL) Special Warfare Officers attend a 6-month Basic Underwater Demolition/SEAL (BUD/S) course followed by a 4-month SEAL Qualification Training (SQT) course before assignment to a SEAL Team. Finally, Special Operations Officers, primarily Explosive Ordnance Disposal (EOD) / Diver officers will have a training track similar in length to that of SEAL officers, to include schools for EOD, SCUBA, hard hat diving, airborne (parachutists) and combat arms skills training before assignment to their first operational assignment.

Restricted Line officers, depending on designator, may train, qualify and be assigned as naval intelligence officers, naval cryptographic officers, aircraft maintenance duty officers, meteorologists/oceanographers, information professionals, human resources professionals, public affairs officers, or a host of other specialties.

Still others may become staff corps officers in the Supply Corps, Civil Engineering Corps, Nurse Corps, Medical Service Corps, or be law school students or medical or dental school students in the Judge Advocate General's Corps, Medical Corps or Dental Corps, respectively.

Limited Duty officers are technical experts that rose from the enlisted ranks. They can fill positions from ensign to captain that require technical skills. LDOs must have been an E-7 (Chief Petty Officer) before applying to the LDO program. LDOs can be Division Officers, Department Heads, Officers-in-Charge, Executive Officers and Commanding Officers, ashore or afloat.

=== Coast Guard ===
While the Coast Guard does not categorize its officers as unrestricted line, restricted line or staff corps, a similar career sorting and training process also takes place, ranging from those in operational fields such as cuttermen aboard Coast Guard cutters, Naval Aviators in Coast Guard Aviation, specialists in maritime safety and inspections, and a host of other Coast Guard officer career fields.

All ensigns will become branch officers or division officers in their first operational assignments, responsible for leading a group of petty officers and enlisted men in one of the ship's, squadrons, team's or other organization's branches and divisions (for example, engineering, navigation, communications, sensors or weapons aboard a warship, or similar functions in the operations, aircraft maintenance, administrative or safety/NATOPS departments in a flying squadron) while at the same time receiving on-the-job training in leadership, naval systems, programs, and policies from higher-ranking officers and from senior enlisted men and women in the Chief Petty Officer rates.

Navy and Coast Guard ensigns wear collar insignia of a single gold bar and because of this share the nickname "butterbars" with Army, Air Force, Space Force, and Marine Corps second lieutenants, who wear the same insignia.

=== Public Health Service Commissioned Corps ===
In the United States Public Health Service Commissioned Corps – a uniformed service in the United States Public Health Service — those wearing the rank of ensign are part of a commissioned officer student training, and extern program (COSTEP), either junior, for those with more than a year remaining of education in a commissionable degree (JRCOSTEP), or senior, for those within one year of graduating with a commissionable degree (SRCOSTEP). Some officers may hold a permanent rank of ensign based on their experience and education, but then can hold the temporary rank of lieutenant, junior grade.

=== NOAA Corps ===
In the National Oceanic and Atmospheric Administration Commissioned Officer Corps (NOAA Corps) – a uniformed service in the National Oceanic and Atmospheric Administration — ensign is the most junior rank. All NOAA Corps officers become ensigns via direct commissions and attending the NOAA Corps Training Center in New London, Conn. All NOAA Corps officers are either mariners or aviators.

=== US Maritime Services ===
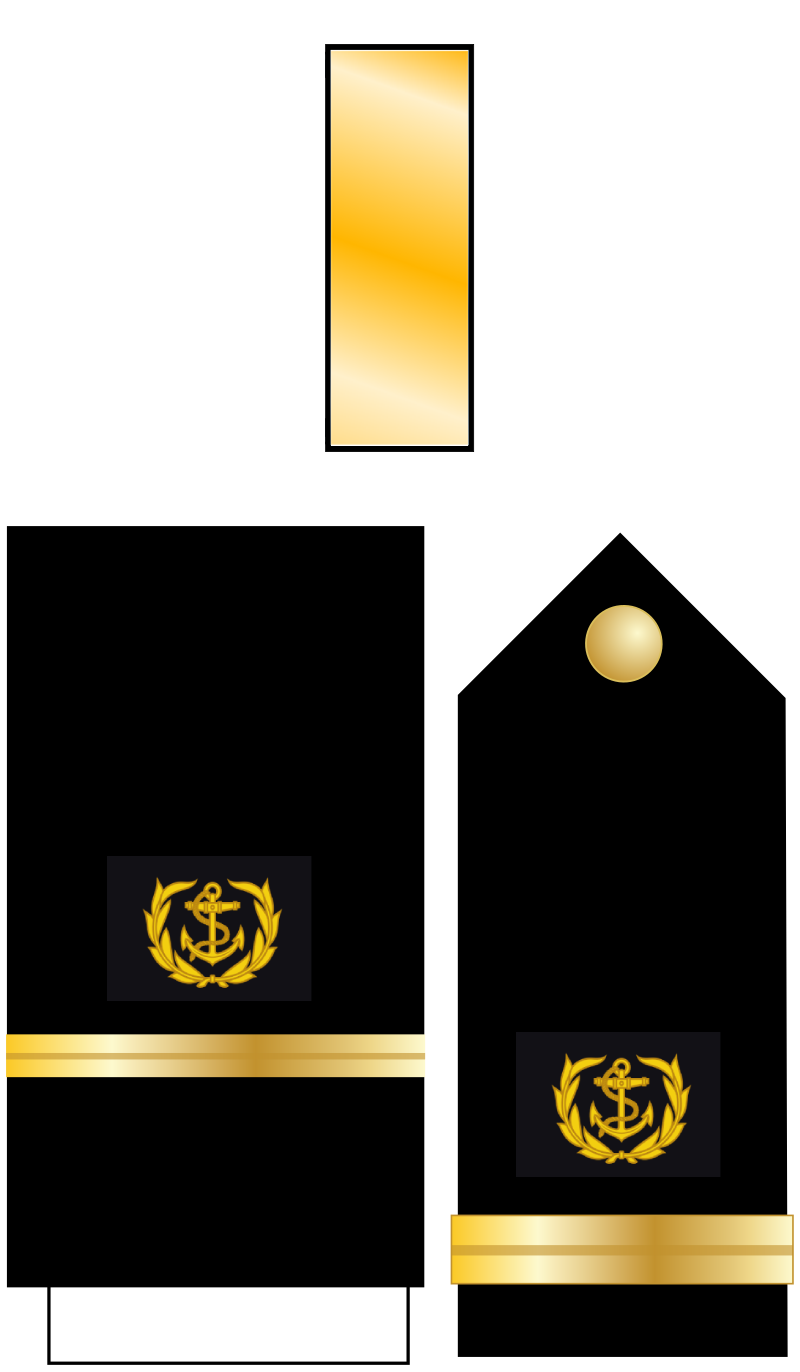
USMS Ensign Insignia

In the United States Maritime Services (USMS) - a voluntary training organization of the U.S. Department of Transportation - ensign is the most junior rank. USMS officers are commissioned into the Naval Reserve after attending the U.S. Merchant Marine Academy or one of the other six maritime academies into the ranks of the U.S. Navy Strategic Sealift Officer Corps as an ensign.

== Gallery ==
Ensign
(Belize Coast Guard)

Ensign
(Republic of Fiji Navy)

Ensign
(Irish: Meirgire)
(Irish Naval Service)

Ensign
(Liberian National Coast Guard)

Ensign
(Namibian Navy)

Ensign
(Royal New Zealand Navy)

Ensign
(Philippine Navy)

Ensign
(South African Navy)

Ensign
(Tanzania Naval Command)

Ensign
(United States Navy)

Ensign
(United States Coast Guard)

=== French-speaking countries ===
Enseigne de vaisseau de 1^{re} classe
(Sub-lieutenant)
(Royal Canadian Navy)

Enseigne de vaisseau de 2^{e} classe
(Acting sub-lieutenant)
(Royal Canadian Navy)

Enseigne de vaisseau de 1^{re} classe
(French Navy)

Enseigne de vaisseau de 2^{e} classe
(French Navy)

Enseigne de vaisseau de 1^{re} classe
(Madagascar Navy)

Enseigne de vaisseau de 2^{e} classe
(Madagascar Navy)

== See also ==
- U.S. Navy officer rank insignia
- Comparative military ranks
- Sub-lieutenant
- Signifer
- Vexillarius
- Alférez
