= Aquilifer =

Roman eagle standard bearer

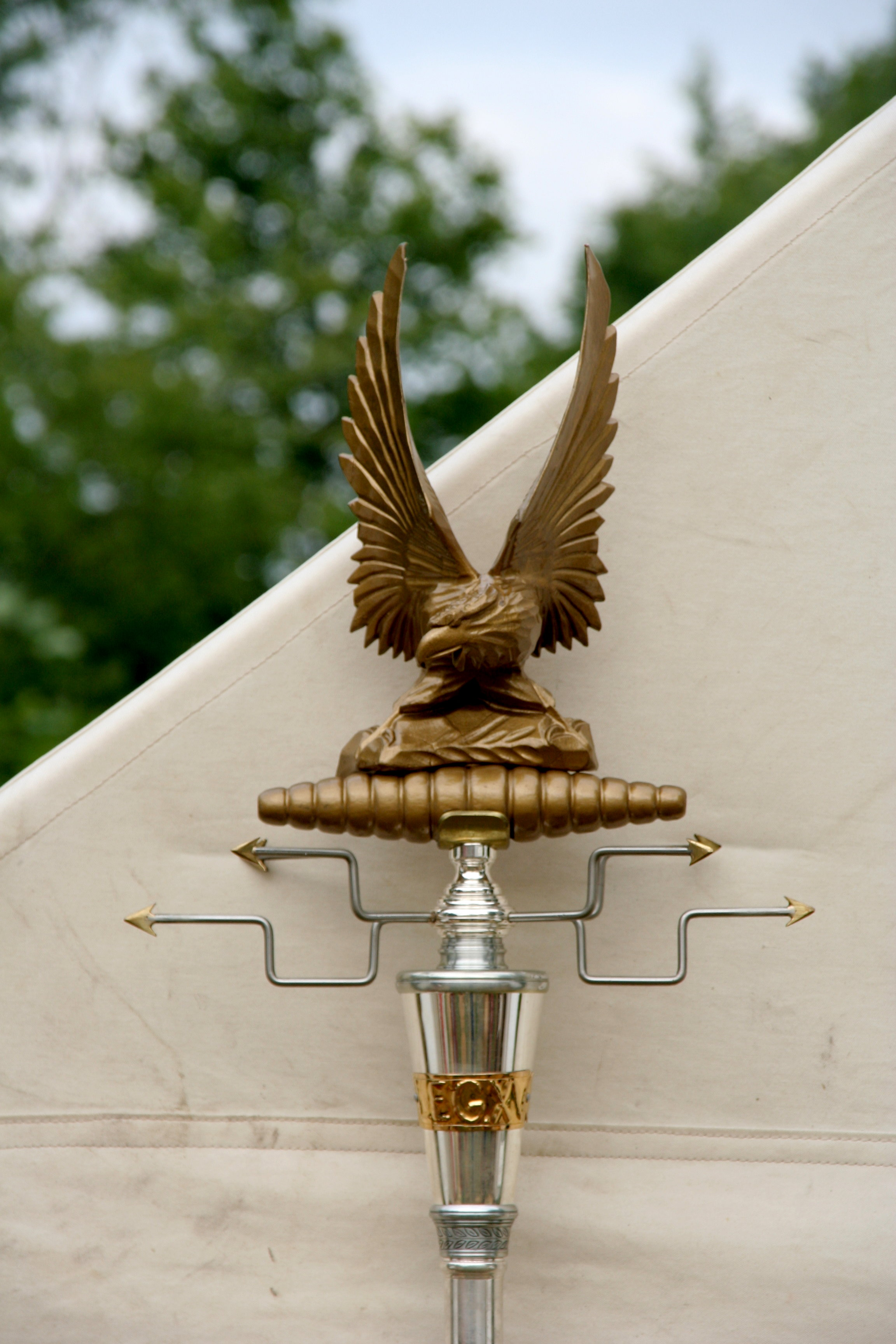
A modern reconstruction of an aquila

An aquilifer (Latin: [aˈkᶣɪlɪfɛr], "eagle-bearer") was one of the signiferi in a Roman legion who carried the eagle standard of the legion. The name derives from the type of standard, aquila, meaning "eagle" (which was the universal type used since 106 BC), and ferre, the Latin word for bringing or carrying. Before that time, the wolf, boar, bull and horse were also used. The eagle standard was the most important possession of the legion, and its loss was a terrible disgrace.

The aquila emblem generally had up-raised wings surrounded by a laurel wreath. It was mounted on a narrow trapezoidal base and mounted on a pole that was held aloft.

The aquilifer's position was accordingly one of enormous prestige, and he was ranked immediately below the centurions and above the optiones, receiving twice the pay of an ordinary legionary (Brunt 1950). Aquilifers carried a small circular shield called a parma that could be strapped on if their hands were already full (Allen 1908). Aquilifers were very easily recognizable not only because of their standard but because they always wore a type of fur: as wolf fur was worn by the vexillarius and bear fur by the signifer, a lion fur was given to the aquilifers. The furs were worn as capes with the head of the animal strapped to the helmet of the bearer.

== Examples of aquilifers in Commentarii de Bello Gallico ==
The idea that great disgrace would fall upon a legion should its eagle fall into enemy hands or the symbolism of its passage being barred by enemies places aquilifers in a key position—that of maintaining a legion's honor.

An aquilifer plays an important role in the landing of Roman soldiers in Britannia, as accounted by Julius Caesar. In de Bello Gallico IV. 25, Britons put up stiff resistance against the Roman landing party, therefore the legionaries delay to avoid engaging with the enemy. To spur on the troops, the aquilifer shouts out, so that all the soldiers can hear him, that despite the common lack of initiative, he would have fulfilled his office for both Julius Caesar, his general, and for the public (pūblicae) thing (reī) (i.e. for the republic); he then immediately jumps from the ship and makes his way to the shore with the eagle so that others may be inspired to follow him. The text reads as such:

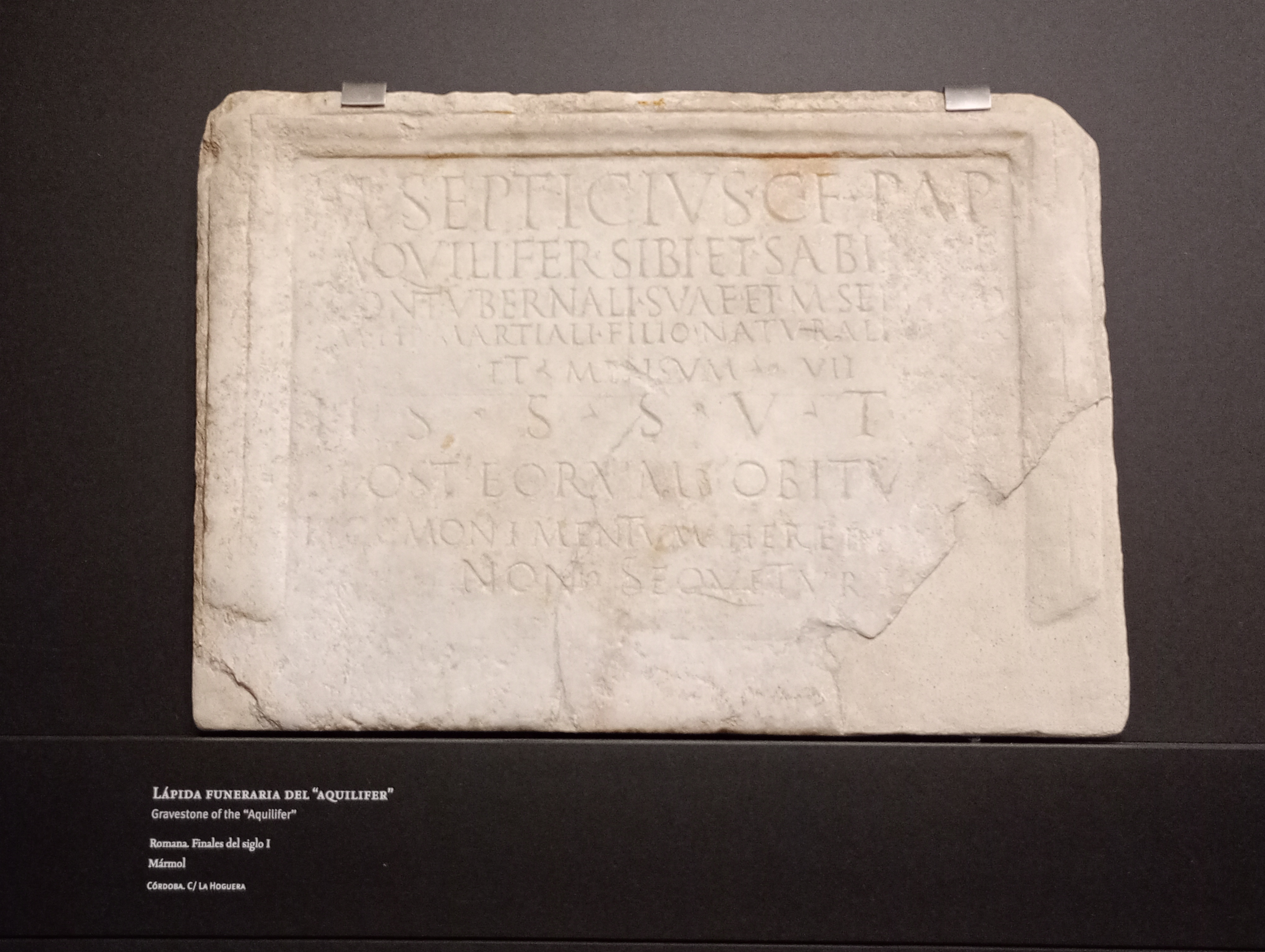
Tombstone of aquilifer M. Septicius, late 1st century AD. Archaeological Museum of Cordoba (Spain).

"'Desilite', inquit, 'commilitiones, nisi vultis aquilam hostibus prodere; ego certe meum rei publicae atque imperatori officium praestitero'. Hoc cum voce magna dixisset, se ex navi proiecit atque in hostes aquilam ferre coepit" (Mueller and Julius Caesar 2013).

Unfortunately for the Romans, chaos ensues as soldiers from different divisions group themselves to the closest standard rather than their assigned one, disturbing battle formation greatly (Julius Caesar 1994–2000).

=== Lucius Petrosidius ===
Few aquilifers are recorded individually in history. An exception to this is Lucius Petrosidius, who is mentioned by Caesar in Commentarii de Bello Gallico, his first hand account of the Gallic Wars. The Latin text says "Ex quibus Lucius Petrosidius aquilifer, cum magna multitudine hostium premeretur, aquilam intra vallum proiecit; ipse pro castris fortissime pugnans occiditur" (Julius Caesar 1914, V:37), which translates to "From which Lucius Petrosidius, an Eagle-bearer, although hard pressed by a great multitude, threw the eagle behind the wall. He was killed most bravely fighting for the camp" (Miller 1922, pp. 139–140; Gill 2018).

== See also ==
- List of Roman army unit types
- Signifer
- Imaginifer
- Vexillarius
- Draconarius
- The Eagle – the protagonist seeks to retrieve the lost eagle of the 9th legion from the hands of Caledonian tribesmen.
