= Draconarius =

Roman cavalry standard-bearer

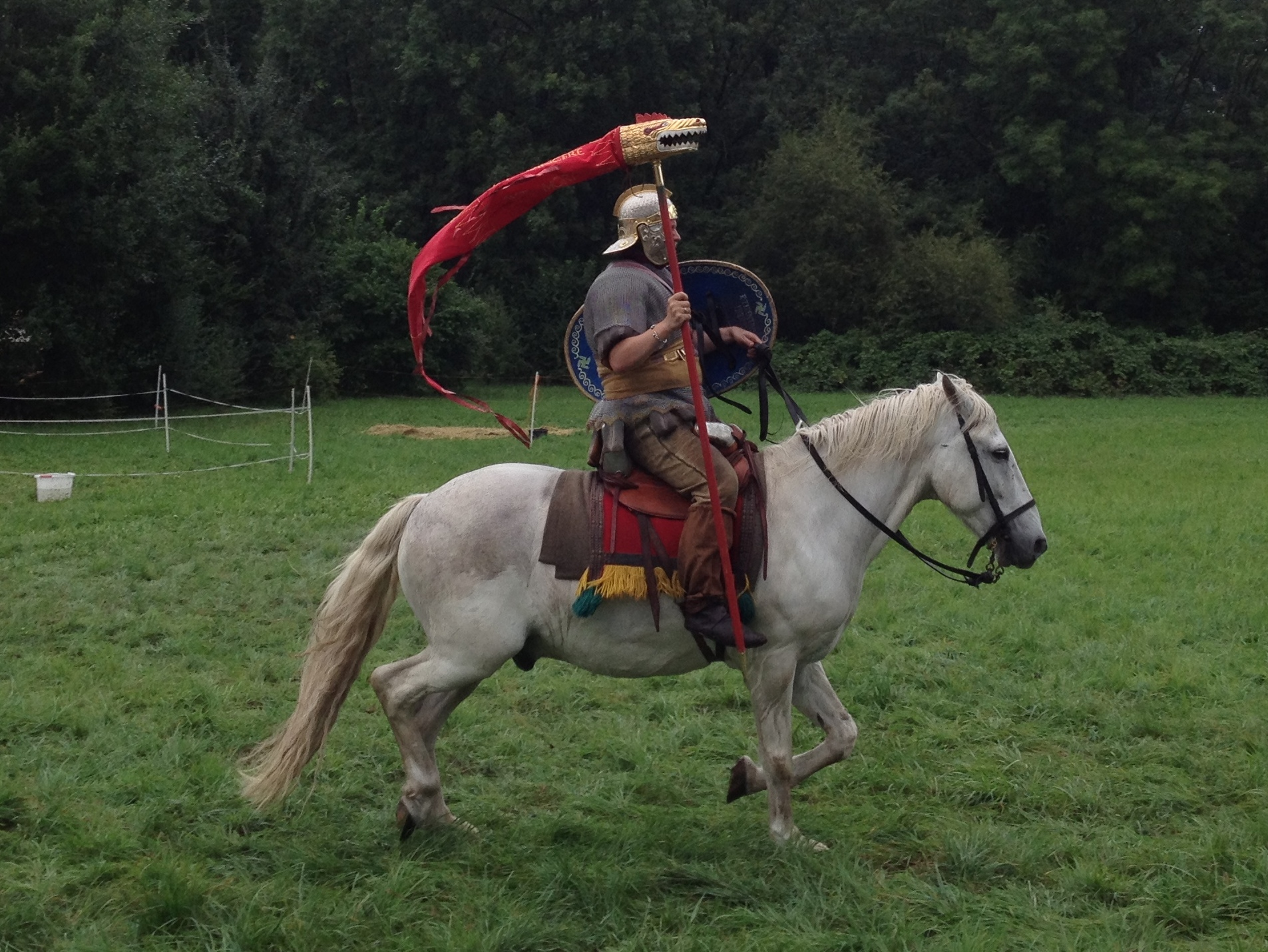
Reenactment of Draconarius at the Roman Festival 2013, Augusta Raurica

The draconarius was a type of signifer who bore a cavalry standard known as a draco in the Roman army.

== Name ==
Strictly speaking, the word draconarius denotes the bearer of the military standard on which a dragon was represented. The term passed into Christian usage, and was applied to the bearer of the labarum in battle, and also to cross-bearers in church processions.

== Dragon ensign ==
From the conquered Dacians, the Romans in Trajan's time borrowed the dragon ensign which became the standard of the cohort as the eagle was that of the legion. Of Dacian, Sarmatian in origin, the draco was later generally introduced in the fourth century as a Roman standard.

It consisted of a bronze dragon head with a fabric body similar in shape to a tail behind it. Wind flowed through the gaping mouth and billowed out the cloth tail much like a modern windsock. It is thought that some form of whistle was mounted in the dragon's neck to make a terrifying noise when galloping.

== See also ==
- Clan of Ostoja
- Dacian warfare
- Aquilifer
- Imaginifer
- Vexillarius
