= Draco (military standard) =

Military standard of the Roman cavalry

The draco ("dragon" or "serpent", plural dracones) was a military standard of the Roman cavalry. Carried by the draconarius, the draco was the standard of the cohort, as the eagle (aquila) was that of the legion.

The draco may have been introduced to the Roman army after the Dacian Wars by Dacian (see Dacian draco) and Sarmatian units in the second century. According to Vegetius, in the fourth century a draco was carried by each legionary cohort.

== Literary descriptions ==
The Greek military writer Arrian describes the draco in his passage on cavalry training exercises, calling it "Scythian":

The Scythian banners are dracontes held aloft on standard-length poles. They are made of colored cloths stitched together, and from the head along the entire body to the tail, they look like snakes. When the horses bearing these devices are not in motion, you see only variegated streamers hanging down. During the charge is when they most resemble creatures: they are inflated by the wind, and even make a sort of hissing sound as the air is forced through them.

Arrian says the colorful banners offer visual pleasure and amazement, but also help the riders position themselves correctly in the complicated drills. The Gallo-Roman Latin poet Sidonius Apollinaris offers a similar, if more empurpled, description.

=== Medieval reception ===
One manuscript of the Estoire de Saint Graal is profuse with illustrations of dracones, with Merlin depicted visually as the personal draconarius (bearer of the dragonhead standard) of King Arthur. The manuscript's artist apparently connected the draco both to the Arthurian story of the red and white dragons and the Biblical story of the brazen serpent.

== Depictions ==
The draco is depicted on the Ludovisi battle sarcophagus, above the horseman who is the central figure in the composition. It appears in several other reliefs, including the Arch of Galerius and the Arch of Constantine, both from the early fourth century. The only fully-preserved copper draco head has been found in Niederbieber.

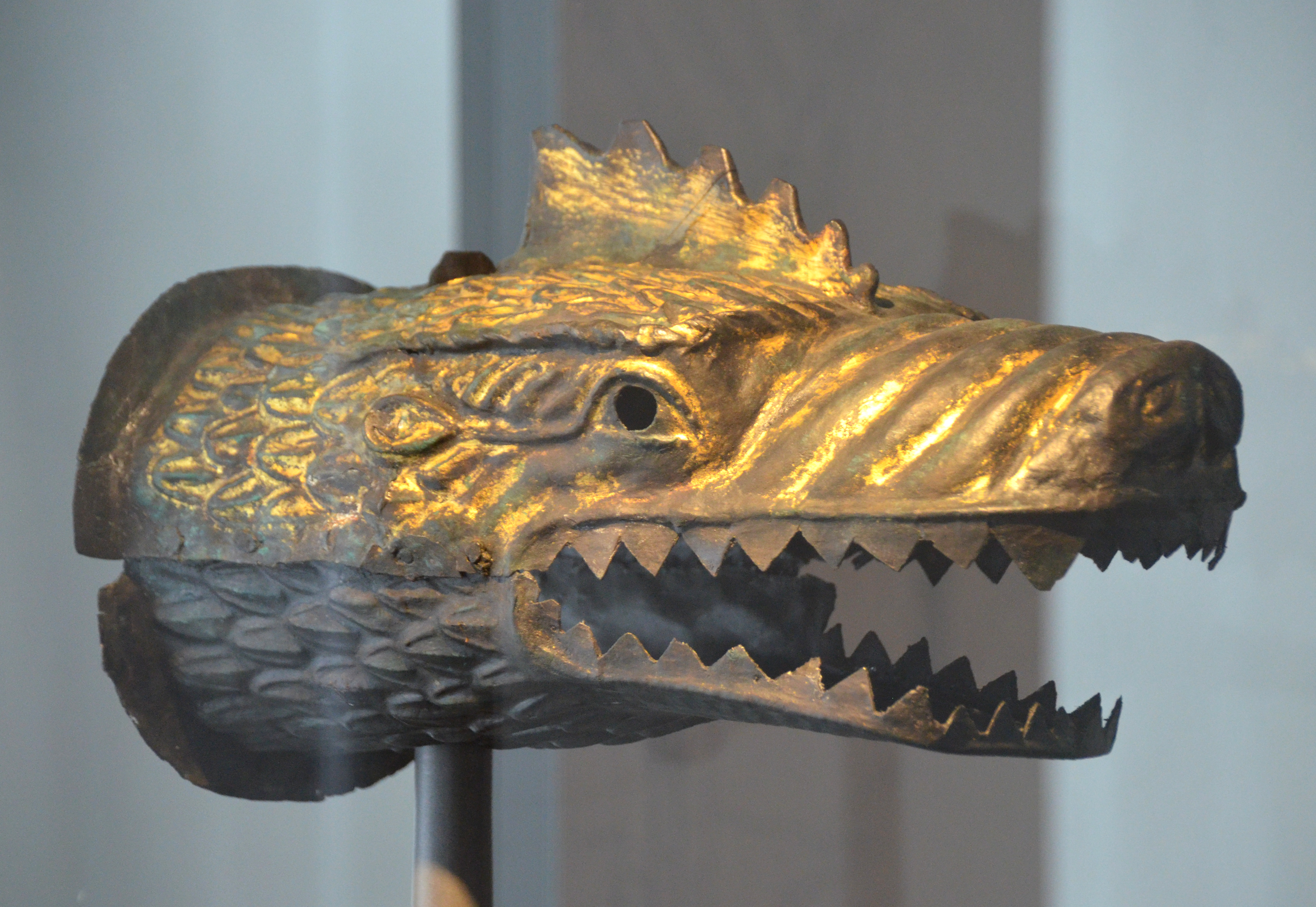
The Draco standard found in the Limes fortress of Niederbieber, Landesmuseum Koblenz, Germany

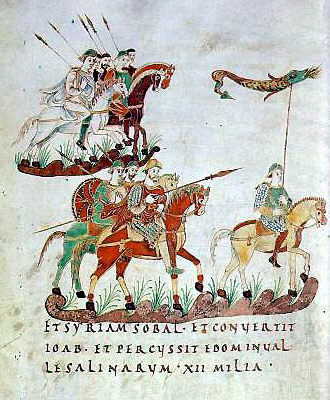
Carolingian cavalrymen with a draco standard from the ninth century

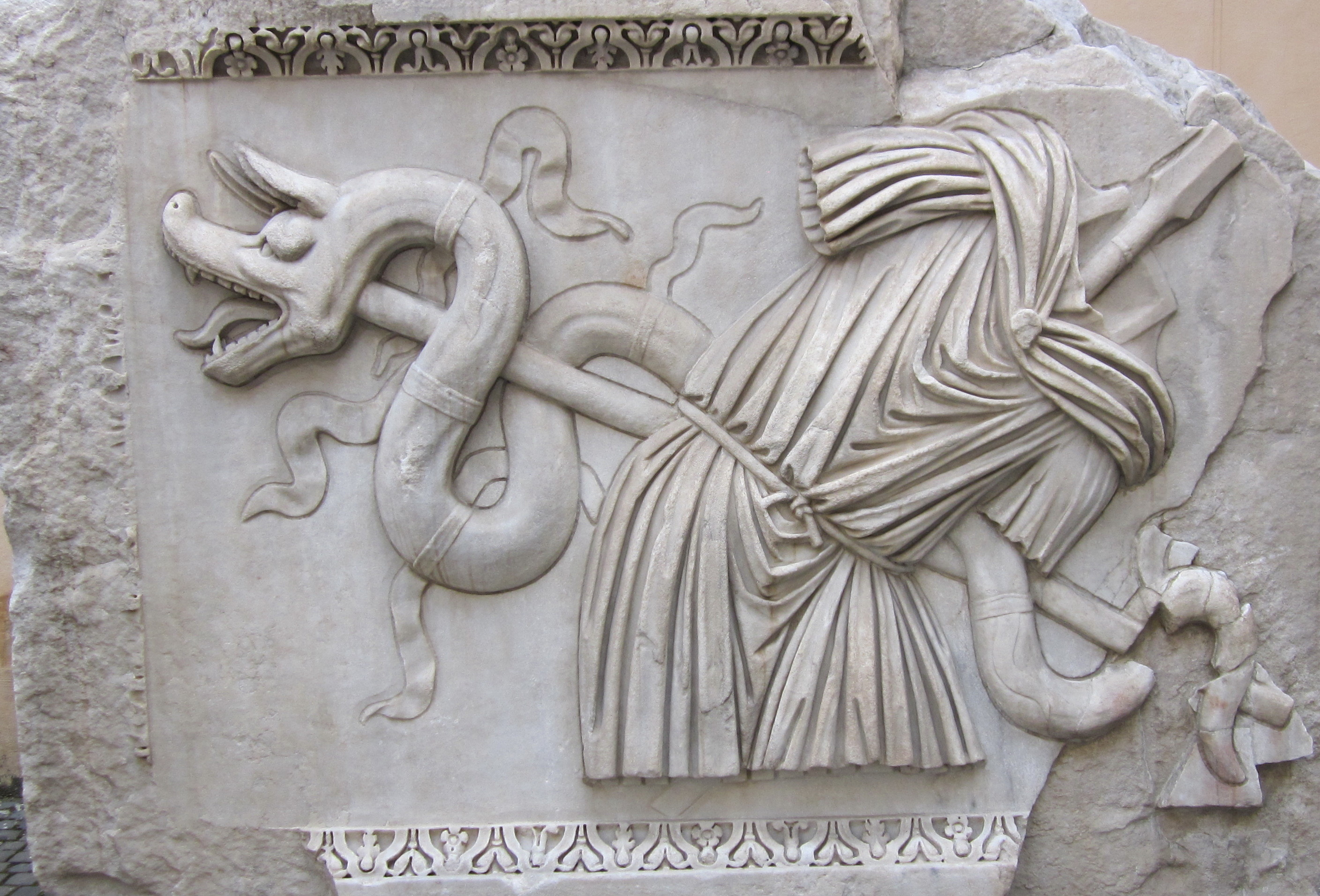
Draco and other war trophies depicted in the Hadrianeum in Rome

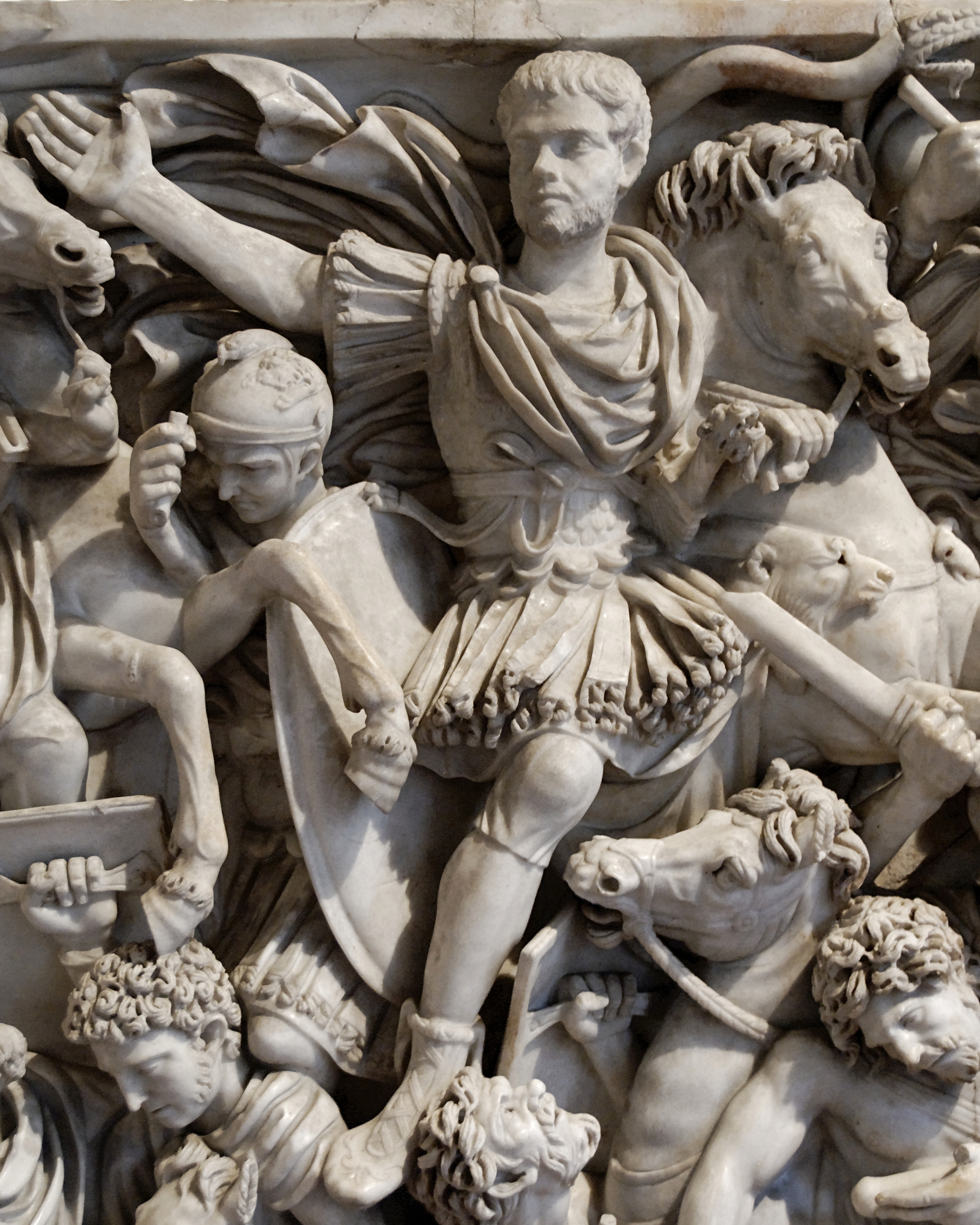
Detail from the Ludovisi battle sarcophagus showing a draco (top right, above the horse's head)

The wizard Merlin (centre) with a draco, Estoire de Saint Graal, 13th-century

== See also ==
- Dacian Draco
- Dacian warfare
- Clan of Ostoja
- Koinobori
