= Imaginifer =

Military rank in the Roman Empire

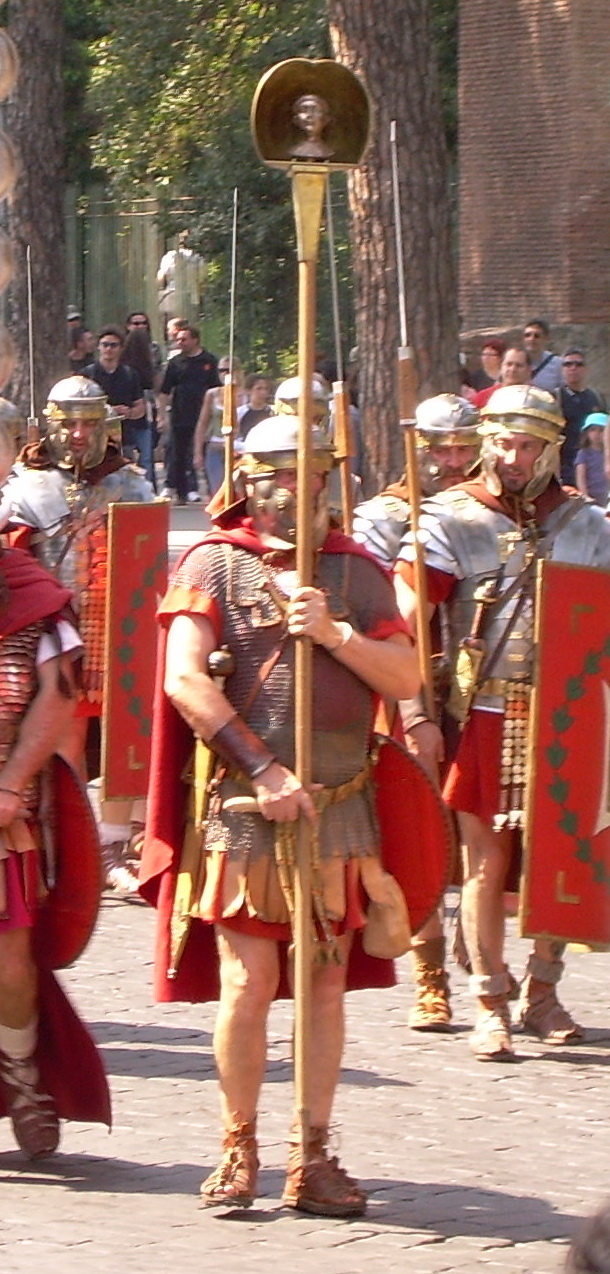

The imaginifer was one of the signiferi in a legion of the Roman Empire who carried the imago (the image) of the emperor.

The imaginifer was added to the ranks of the legions when the imperial cult was first established during the reign of Augustus. The image was a three-dimensional portrait made from beaten metal. It was carried only in the leading cohort.

== See also ==
- Aquilifer
- Vexillarius
- Draconarius
