= Signifer =

Roman standard-bearer

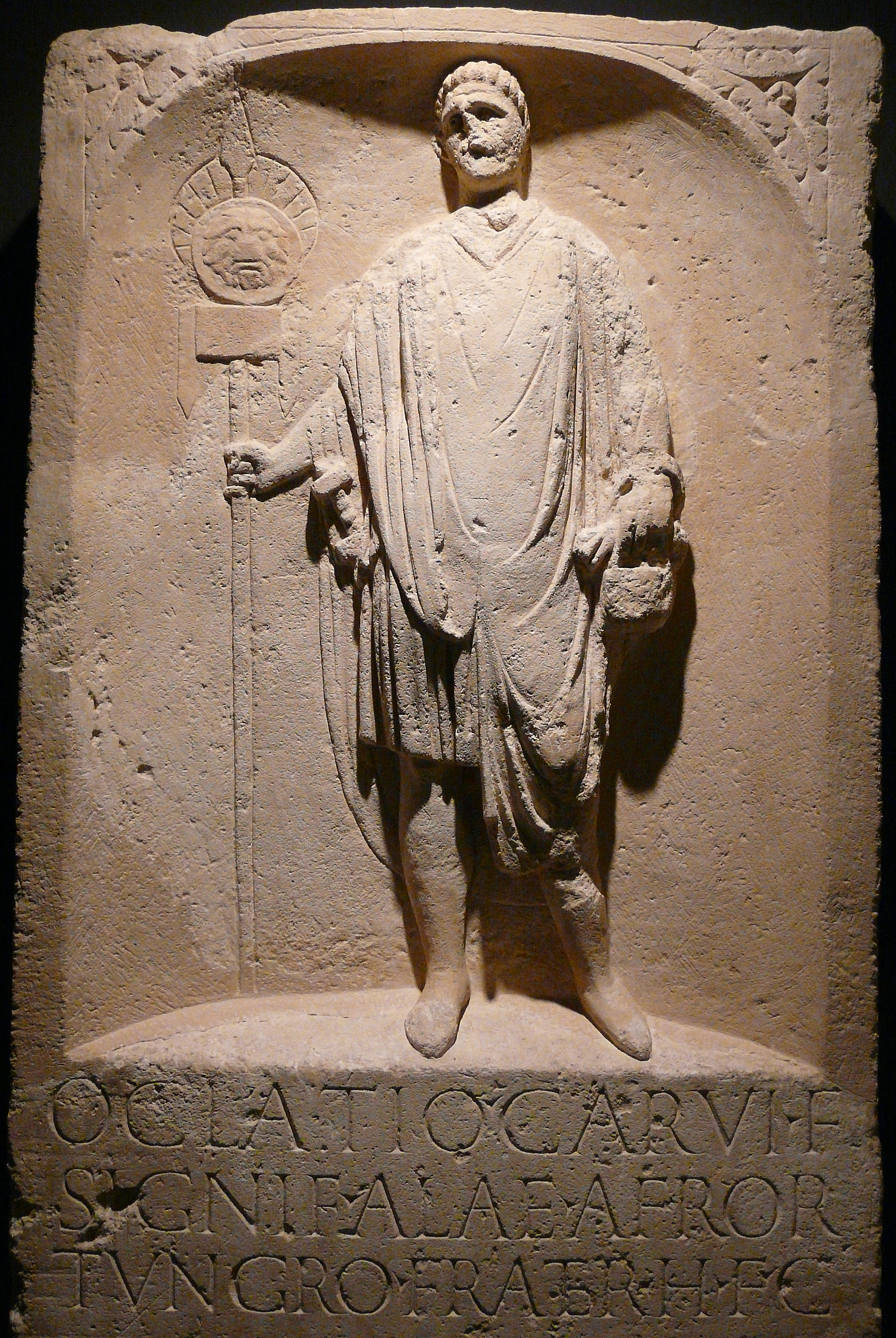
Gravestone for the signifer Oclatius.

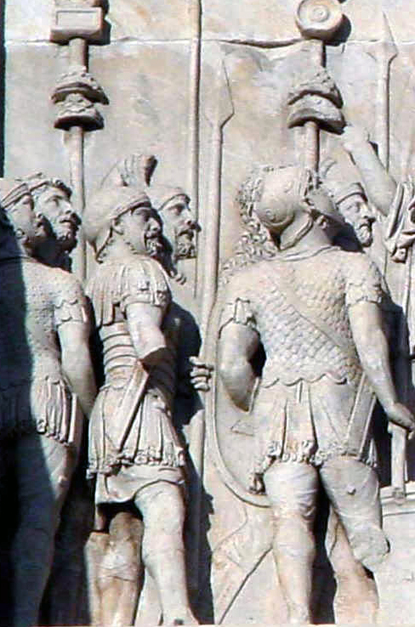
Relief in the Arch of Constantine depicting several signiferes

A signifer (Latin: [ˈsɪŋnɪfɛr]) was a standard bearer of the Roman legions. He carried a signum (standard) for a cohort or century. Each century had a signifer so there were 60 in a legion. Within each cohort, the first century's signifer would be the senior one. The -fer in signifer comes from ferre, the Latin for 'to bear' or 'to carry'.

== Standard-bearer ==
The standard had a number of phalerae (disks or medallions) along with a number of other elements mounted on a pole. The pole could be topped with a leaf-shaped spear head or a manus (open human hand) image denoting the oath of loyalty taken by the soldiers. It sometimes included a representation of a wreath, probably denoting an honour or award.

The task of carrying the signum in battle was dangerous: a soldier had to stand in the first rank and could carry only a small buckler. It was that banner around which the men from each individual century would rally. A soldier could also gain the position of discentes signiferorum, or standard bearer in training. If the signifer was lost in battle, the whole unit was dishonored.

== Uniform ==
Archaeological and literary sources indicate that standard bearers wore mostly bear furs and sometimes lion furs. Although often depicted and adopted in modern re-enactments covering their helmets with wolf furs, those animals are never mentioned.

== Treasurer ==
In addition to carrying the signum, the signifer also assumed responsibility for the financial administration of the unit and functioned as the legionaries' treasurer. The Signifer was also a Duplicarius, paid twice the basic wage.

== Roman Republic and Roman Empire ==
In the Roman Republic, the signifer probably applied to all standard bearers, but in the Roman Empire, the signifer was just one of a number of types of signiferi, which also included aquilifers (responsible for the legion's aquila), imaginifers (who carried an image of the emperor), vexillarii (who carried the Vexillum, a banner representing the legion), and draconarii (who carried the standard of a cavalry unit).

== See also ==
- Aquilifer
- Imaginifer
- Vexillarius
- Draconarius

== Sources ==
- Zehetner, S. 2011: Der Signifer. Stellung und Aufgaben in der Kaiserzeitlichen Armee. VDM Verlag, Saarbrücken.
