= Archaeological and Ethnological Museum of Córdoba =

- Museo Arqueológico y Etnológico de Córdoba
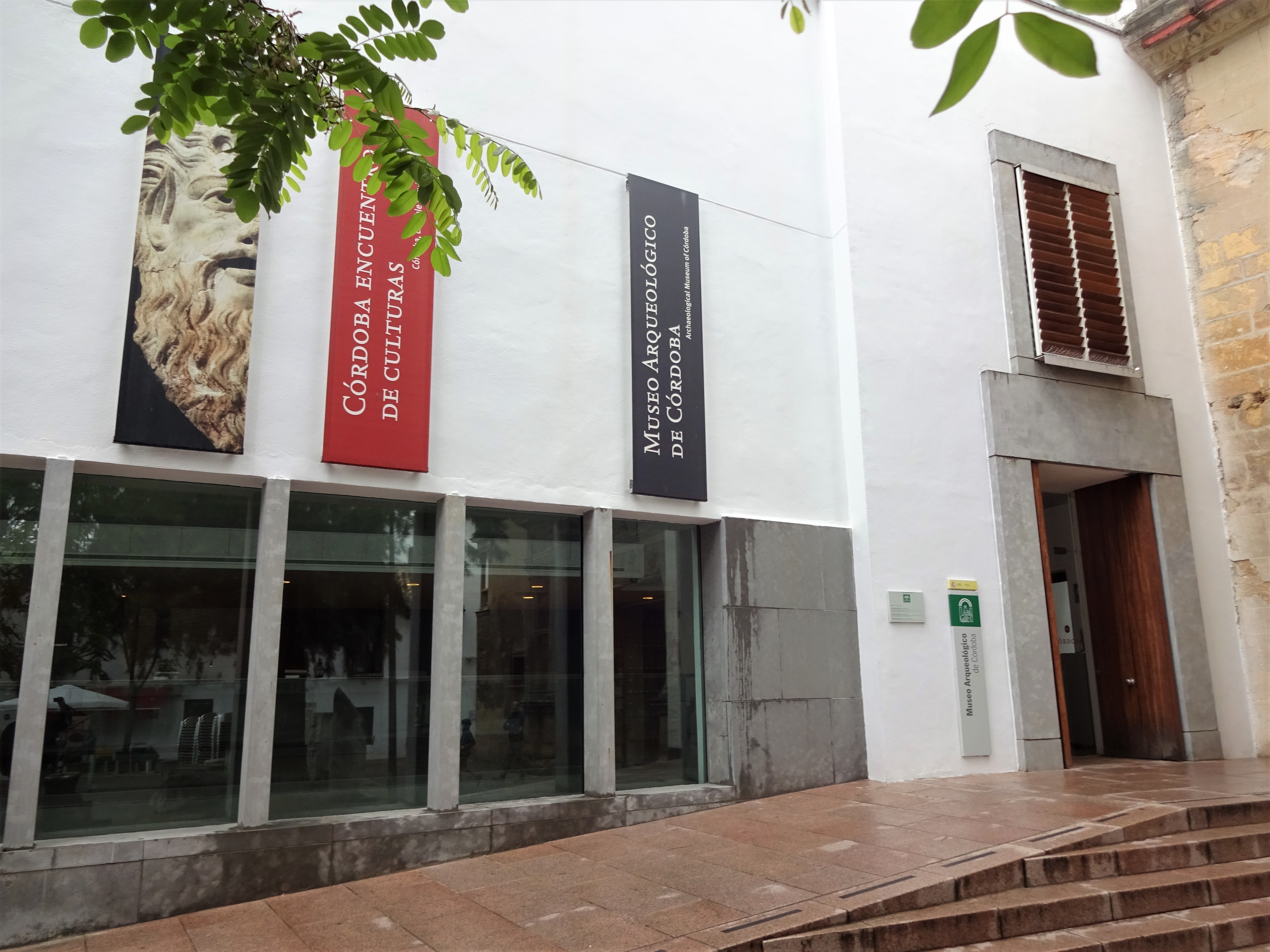
- Museum's facade
- Established: 1867
- Location: Córdoba, Spain
- Coordinates: 37°52′55″N 4°46′41″W
- Type: Archaeological museum
- Owner: General State Administration

The Archaeological and Ethnological Museum of Córdoba (Spanish: Museo Arqueológico y Etnológico de Córdoba; MAECO or simply Museo Arqueológico de Córdoba) is a museum in Córdoba, Spain. Owned by the Spanish State, its management has been transferred to the Ministry of Culture of the Junta of Andalusia.

== History ==
The formal creation of the Provincial Archeological Museum was predated by an initiative proposed in 1866 and the ensuing decree for the creation of provincial museums issued on 20 March 1867. The museum was originally mixed with the Museum of Fine Arts, so a number of efforts to obtain an independent premises for the increasing collection of archeological items were taken. Following a number of relocations of the collection, the Spanish State bought the Rennaissance palace of Páez de Castillejo in 1942 as new premises for the museum. The works for the adaptation for exhibition purposes took place between 1945 and 1959.

The museum was transferred from the Spanish State to the regional administration of Andalusia via a Royal Decree issue on 29 February 1984. The museum earned the name of Museo Arqueológico y Etnológico de Córdoba in 1994. A new annex building was opened in 2011. The museum incorporates its own archeological site, featuring the remains of the city's Roman theatre.

== Pieces ==
The collection could be divided in three large subgroups: 1) Prehistory and Protohistory, 2) Rome and the Visigothic Culture and 3) Islam and Mudéjar art.

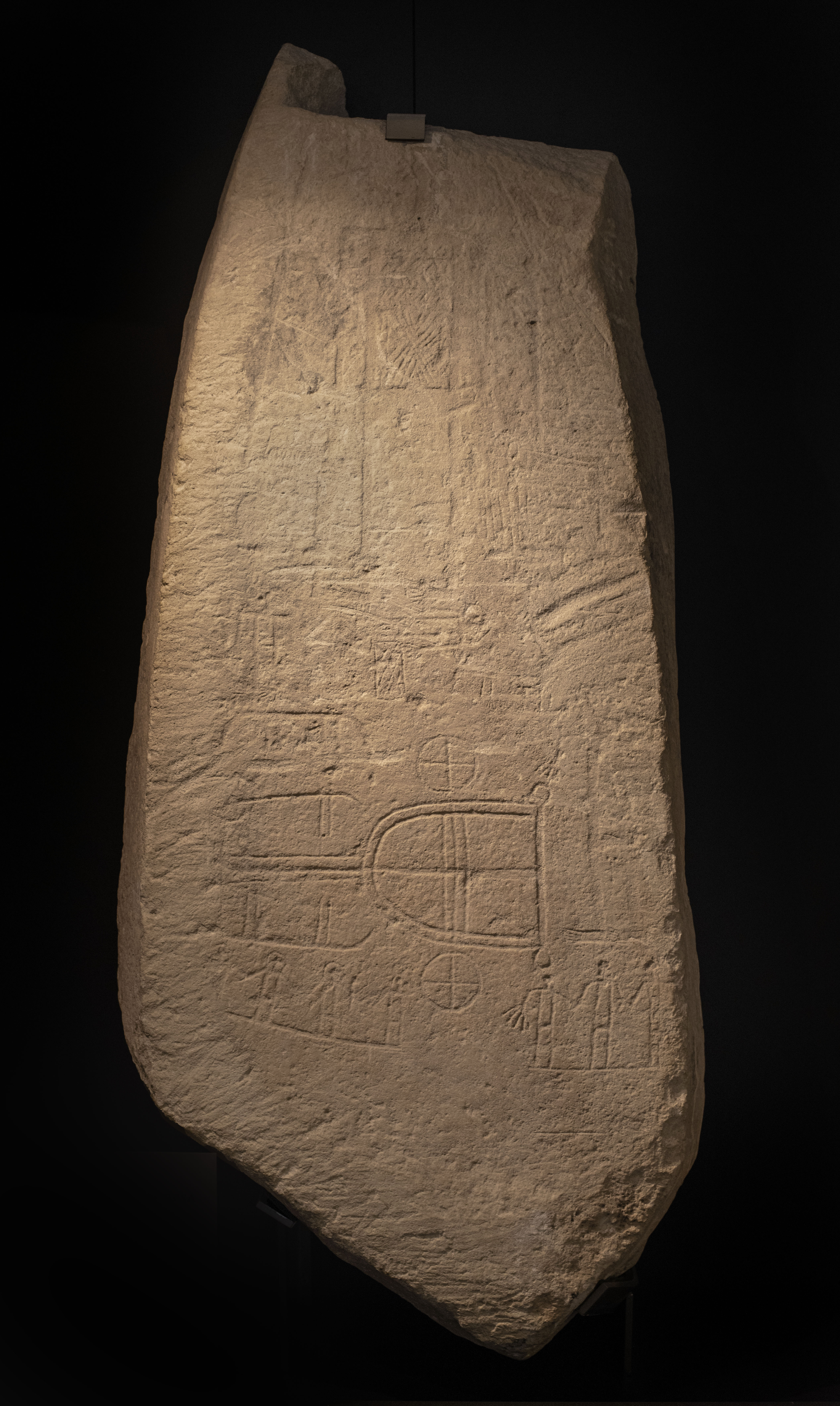
Ategua stele

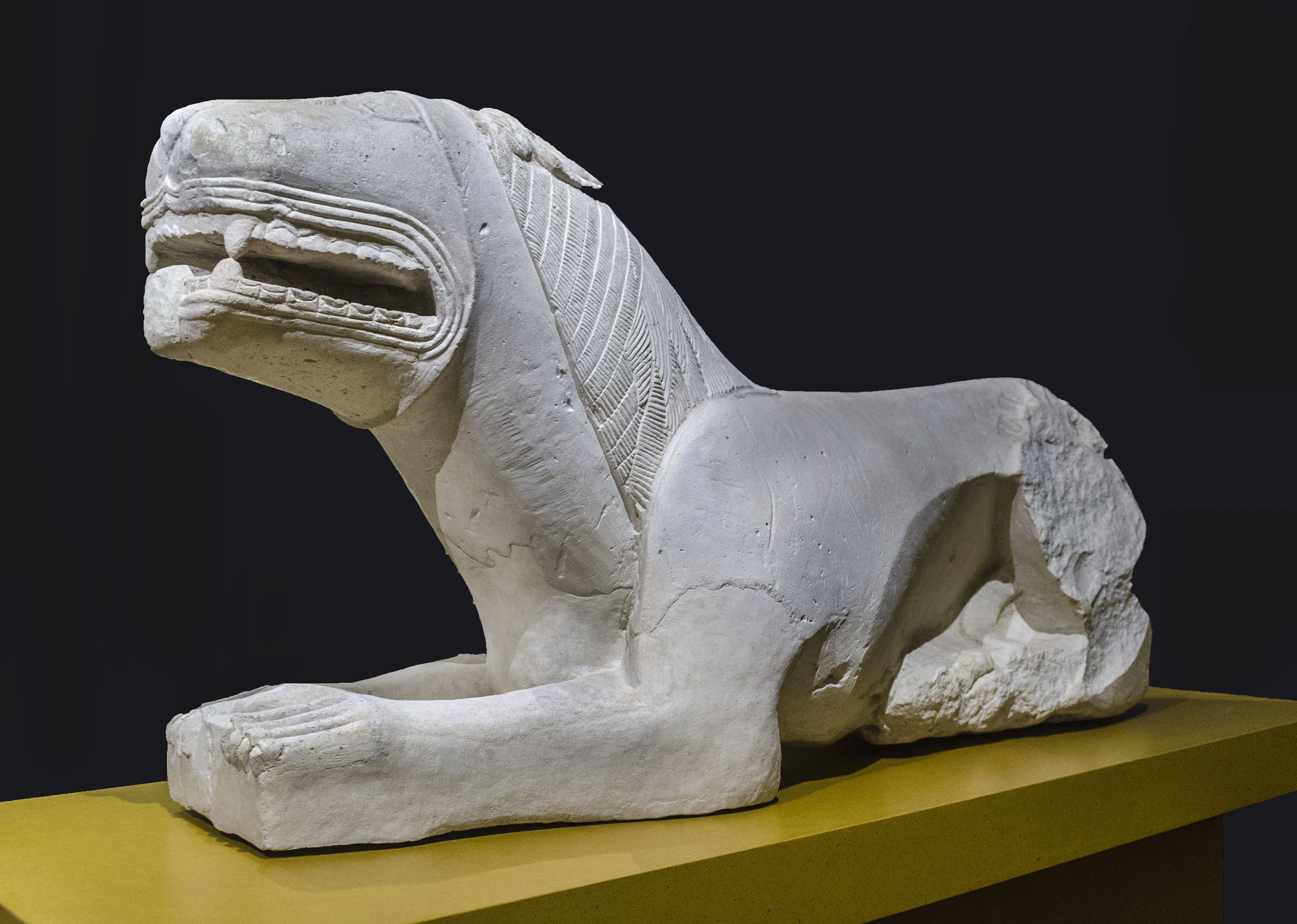
Iberian lion of Nueva Carteya

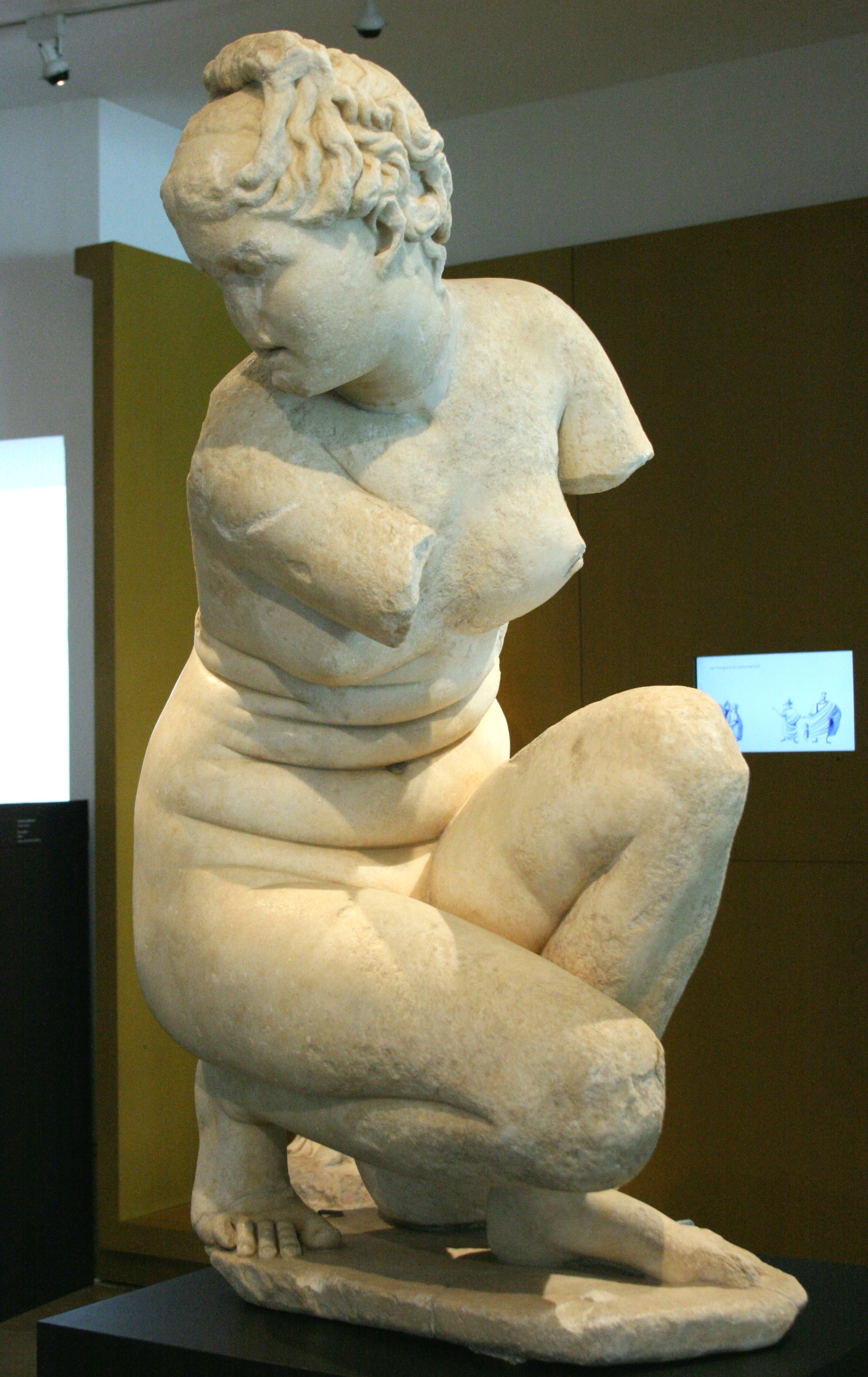
Crouching Aphrodite

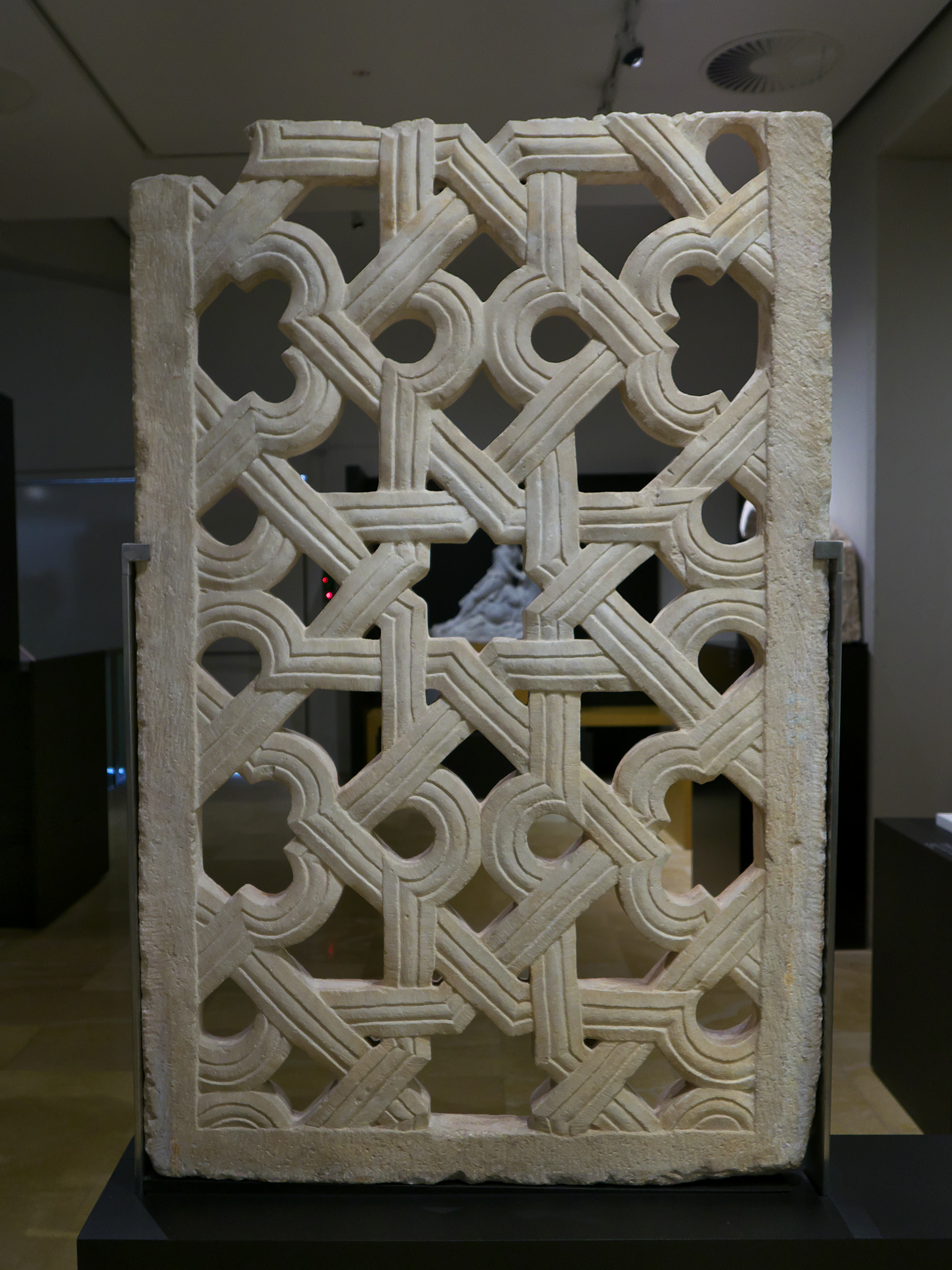
Caliphal latticework

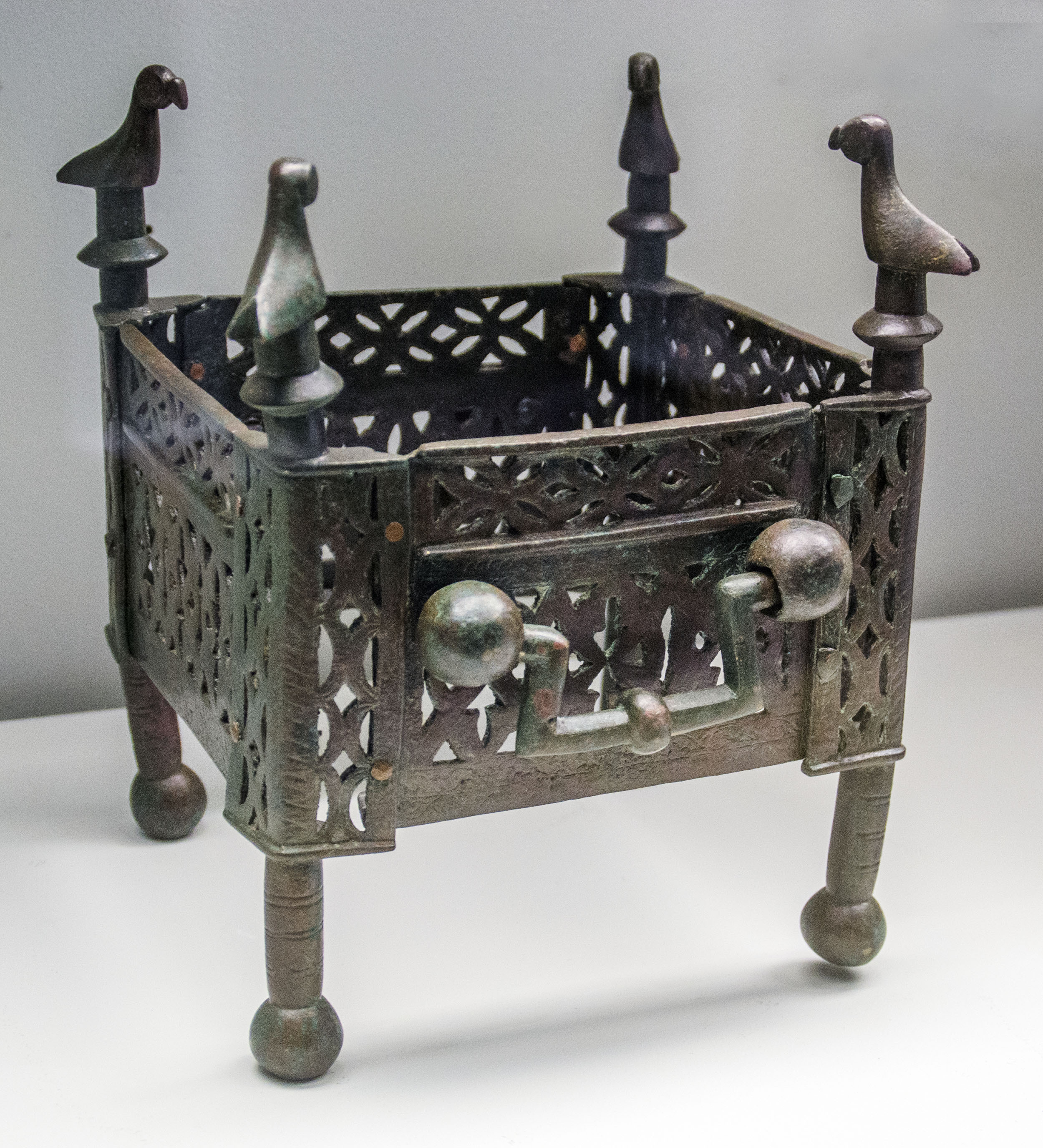
Almohad brazier
