= Vexillarius =

Roman soldier

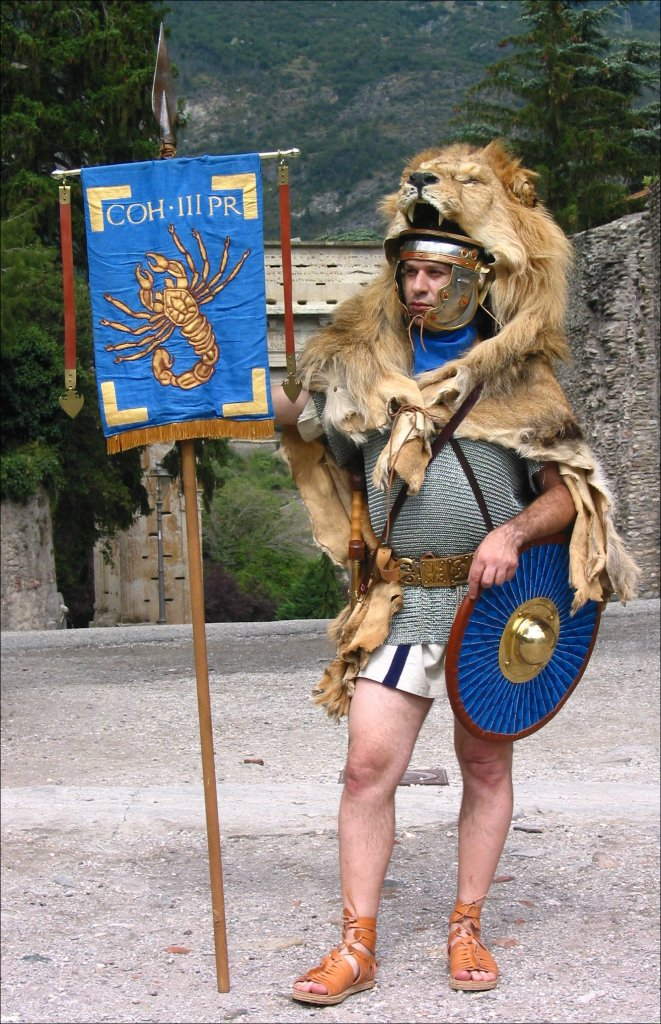
A reenactor, equipped as a vexillifer, with a vexillum standard

Vexillarius is a term referring to one of several distinct types of Roman soldier. A vexillarius, or vexillifer, was one of the signiferi in a Roman legion. His duty was to carry the vexillum, a military standard displaying the name and emblem of the legion. This standard consisted of a woven fabric banner, hung on a crossbar attached to a pole or lance. It was used by both infantry and cavalry. It could designate a vexillation (Latin: vexillatio), a detachment from a larger unit, though it was most likely also a standard for regular complete or component units (such as legions, cohorts, alae).

The term vexillarius may also refer to specially re-enlisted veterans. These soldiers were so named because they served in a company (vexillatio) under their own vexillum standard within the legion, separate from the ordinary legionaries in the cohorts of that same legion. They had privileged status and were exempt from most basic duties other than combat or those other special skills they may have supplied.

Thirdly, vexillarius might have referred to any soldier serving in a temporary detachment or vexillation, away from the parent unit.

The vexillarius' uniform consisted of standard Roman armor and a helmet. Where a vexillarius was a standard-bearer (vexillifer), he will have had, in place of the customary crest, the top of the helmet decorated with animal fur, such as a lion or wolf.

== See also ==
- Aquilifer
- Draconarius
- Imaginifer
