= Guberevac (Leskovac) =

Guberevac Губеревац
- Town
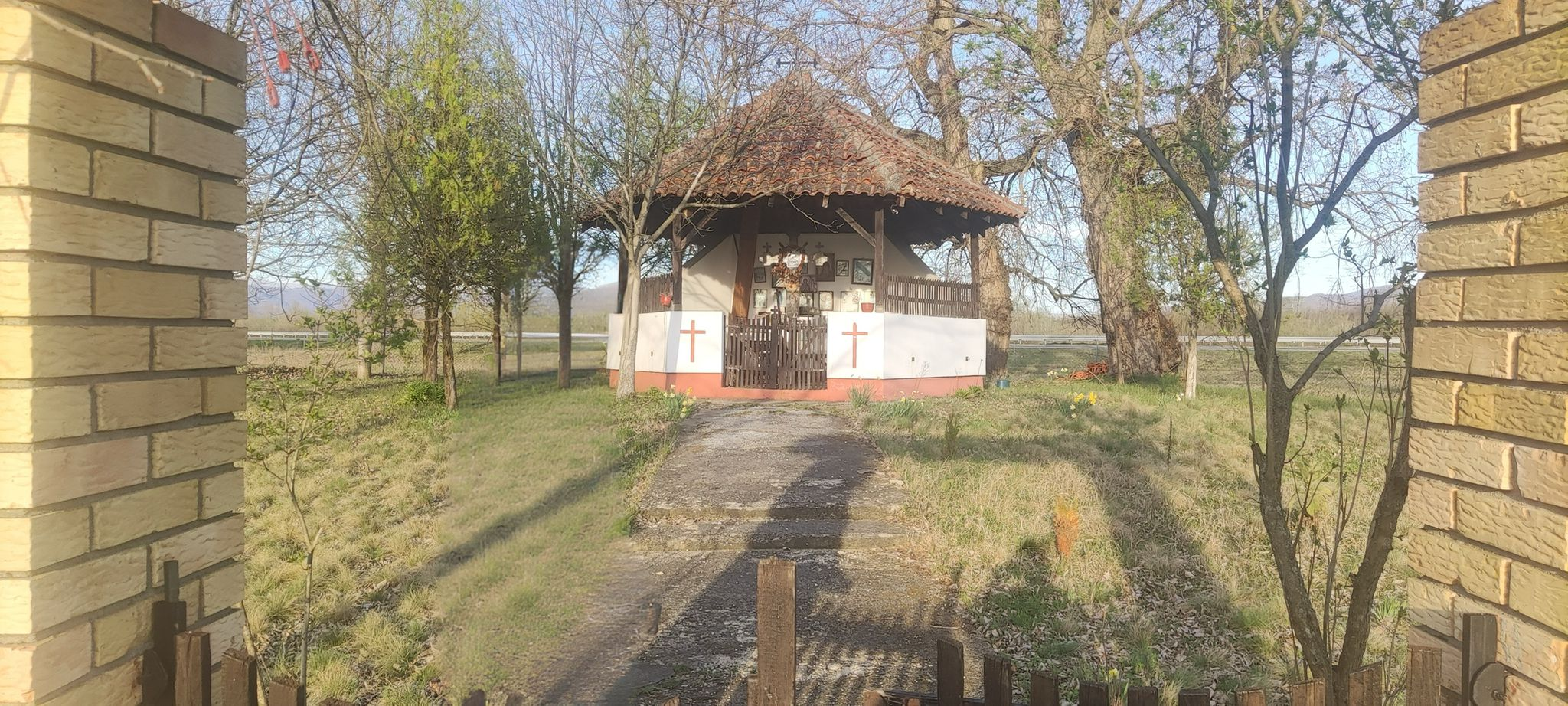

- Location within Serbia
- Coordinates: 42°57′12″N 22°01′39″E
- Country: Serbia
- District: Jablanica District
- Municipality: Leskovac
- Elevation: 764 ft (233 m)

Population (2002)
  - Total: 1,875
- Time zone: UTC+1 (CET)
  - Summer (DST): UTC+2 (CEST)
- Postal code: 16211

Guberevac is a settlement of the Leskovac city in the Jablanica District. According to the 2022 Serbian census, it had 1,424 inhabitants.

An elementary school is located here.

== Demographics ==
The village of Guberevac has 1,492 adult inhabitants, with an average age of 41.5 years (40.9 for men and 42.2 for women). There are 448 households in the village, and the average number of members per household is 4.19.

This settlement is largely populated by Serbs (according to the 2002 census).
